= List of people from Texas =

State flag of Texas

Location of Texas in the United States

The following are notable people who were either born, raised or have lived for a significant period of time in the U.S. state of Texas.

== Founders and early settlers of Texas ==
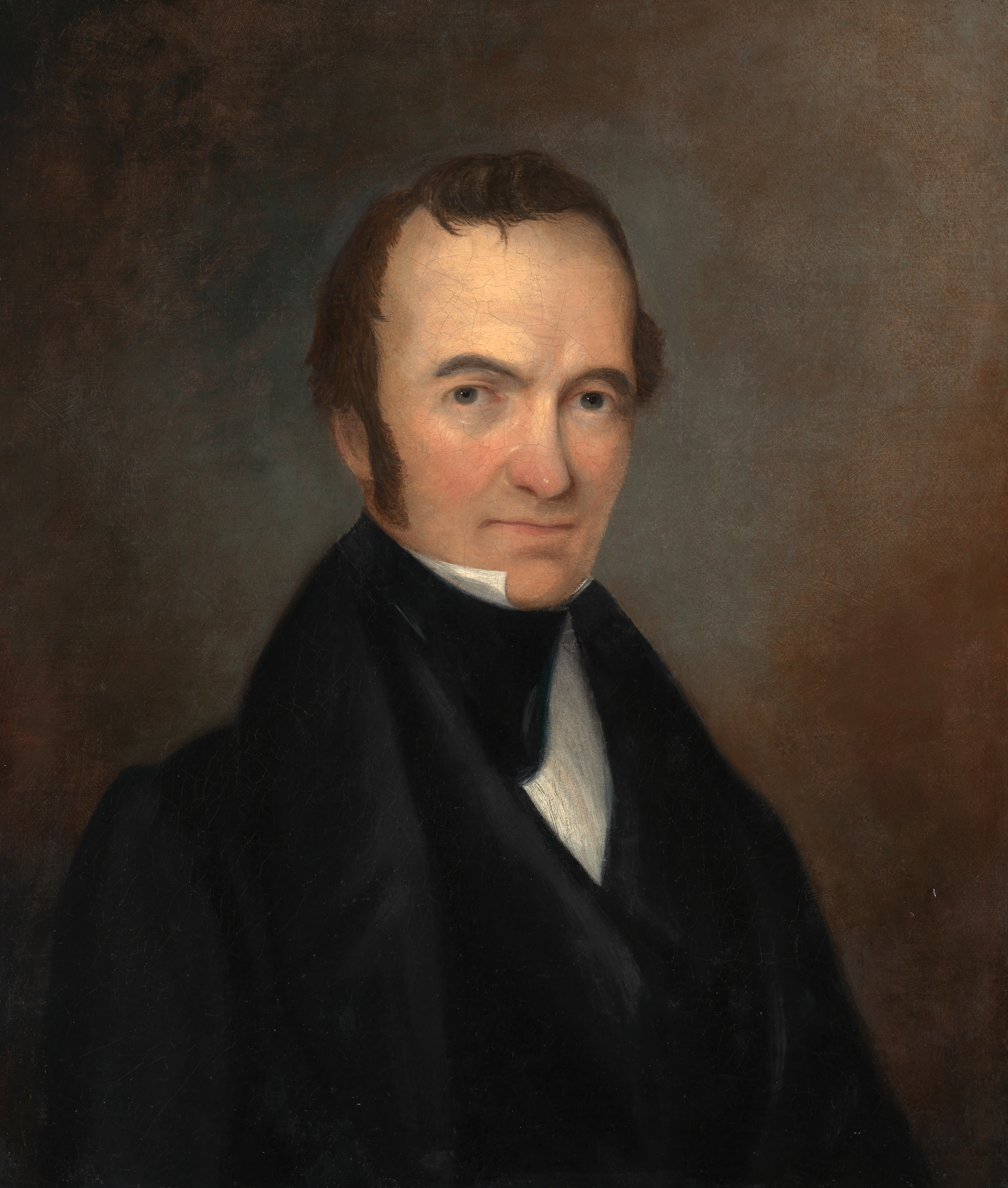
Stephen F. Austin

- Augustus Chapman Allen (1806–1864), founder of Houston
- Charlotte Baldwin Allen (1805–1895), financed founding of Houston, known as the "mother of Houston"
- John Kirby Allen (1810–1838), founder of Houston
- Stephen F. Austin (1793–1836), "father of Texas"
- Padre José Nicolás Ballí (c. 1770–1829), grantee, settler, and namesake of Padre Island
- Plácido Benavides (1810–1837), settler
- Joshua Brown (1816–1876), first settler of Kerrville, Texas
- John Neely Bryan (1810–1877), founder of Dallas
- Moses Austin Bryan (1817–1895), early settler of Texas
- David G. Burnet (1788–1870), interim president of Republic of Texas
- Mathew Caldwell (1798–1842), settler
- Prince Carl of Solms-Braunfels (1812–1875), established colonies of German immigrants in Texas
- Henri Castro (1786–1865), Jewish empresario
- William Leslie Cazneau (1807–1876), pioneer
- Jesse Chisholm (1806–1868), Indian trader, guide, interpreter, namesake of Chisholm Trail
- Holland Coffee (1807–1846), settler in Lake Texoma area, trader, guide, interpreter
- Jao de la Porta (fl. 1810s), trader, financed settlement of Galveston Island
- Green DeWitt (1787–1835), empresario, namesake of DeWitt County
- Susanna Dickinson (1814–1883), DeWitt Colonist, witnessed and survived Battle of the Alamo
- John Marie Durst (1797–1851), settler
- Angelina Eberly (1798–1860), stopped the attempted removal from Austin of the Republic of Texas Archives, thereby preserving Austin's status as the capital of Texas
- Johann Friedrich Ernst (born Friedrich Diercks) (1796–1848), first German to bring family to Texas, benefactor to German immigrants
- Warren Angus Ferris (1810–1873), early surveyor of Dallas
- Henry Francis Fisher (1805–1867), German settler, explored and colonized San Saba area
- Samuel Rhoads Fisher (1794–1839), settler in Republic of Texas and later its secretary of Navy; namesake of Fisher County
- George Washington Glasscock (1810–1868), settler, legislator, businessman; namesake of Georgetown, Texas and Glasscock County
- Betty Holekamp (1826–1902), German Texan pioneer, called the Betsy Ross of Texas
- Sam Houston (1793–1863), first and third president of Republic of Texas, later U.S. senator and governor of Texas
- Anson Jones (1798–1858), last president of Republic of Texas, called "Architect of Annexation"
- Mirabeau B. Lamar (1798–1859), second president of Republic of Texas, one of strongest proponents of Texas Navy
- Herman Lehmann (1859–1932), kidnapped in 1870 and raised by Apache Indians
- Gideon Lincecum (1793–1874), pioneer, historian, physician, philosopher, naturalist
- Jane Herbert Wilkinson Long (1798–1880), considered the "mother of Texas"
- Collin McKinney (1766–1861), drafter of Texas Declaration of Independence; both Collin County and its county seat, McKinney, are named for him
- John Henry Moore (1800–1880), early settler
- Jose Antonio Navarro (1795–1871), Texas statesman, revolutionary and politician
- Robert Neighbors (1815–1859), Indian agent, soldier, legislator
- Cynthia Ann Parker (1826–1870), kidnapped in 1836 and raised by Comanche Indians; mother of Quanah Parker, the last Comanche chief
- Daniel Parker (1781–1844), settler, church founder
- James W. Parker (1797–1864), early settler
- John Parker (1758–1836), pioneer Texas settler
- John Richard Parker (1834–1915), kidnapped in 1836 by Comanche Indians
- Emily Austin Perry (1795–1851), early settler of Texas
- Elijah Sterling Clack Robertson (1820–1879), early settler, translator, lawyer, postmaster
- Sterling C. Robertson (1785–1842), impresario, colony founder; signed Texas Declaration of Independence
- Jose Policarpo Rodriguez (1829–1914), surveyor, scout, established Tejano settlement near present-day Bandera
- Thomas Jefferson Rusk (1803–1857), secretary of war of Republic of Texas, chief justice of Supreme Court of Texas, U.S. senator after state's admission to U.S.
- Charles Stillman (1810–1875), founder of Brownsville, Texas
- Martin Varner (1785–1844), early settler
- Edwin Waller (1800–1881), judge and signer of Texas Declaration of Independence
- Lorenzo de Zavala (1788–1836), first vice president of Republic of Texas, signer of Texas Declaration of Independence

== Military ==
=== The Texas Revolution/The Alamo ===
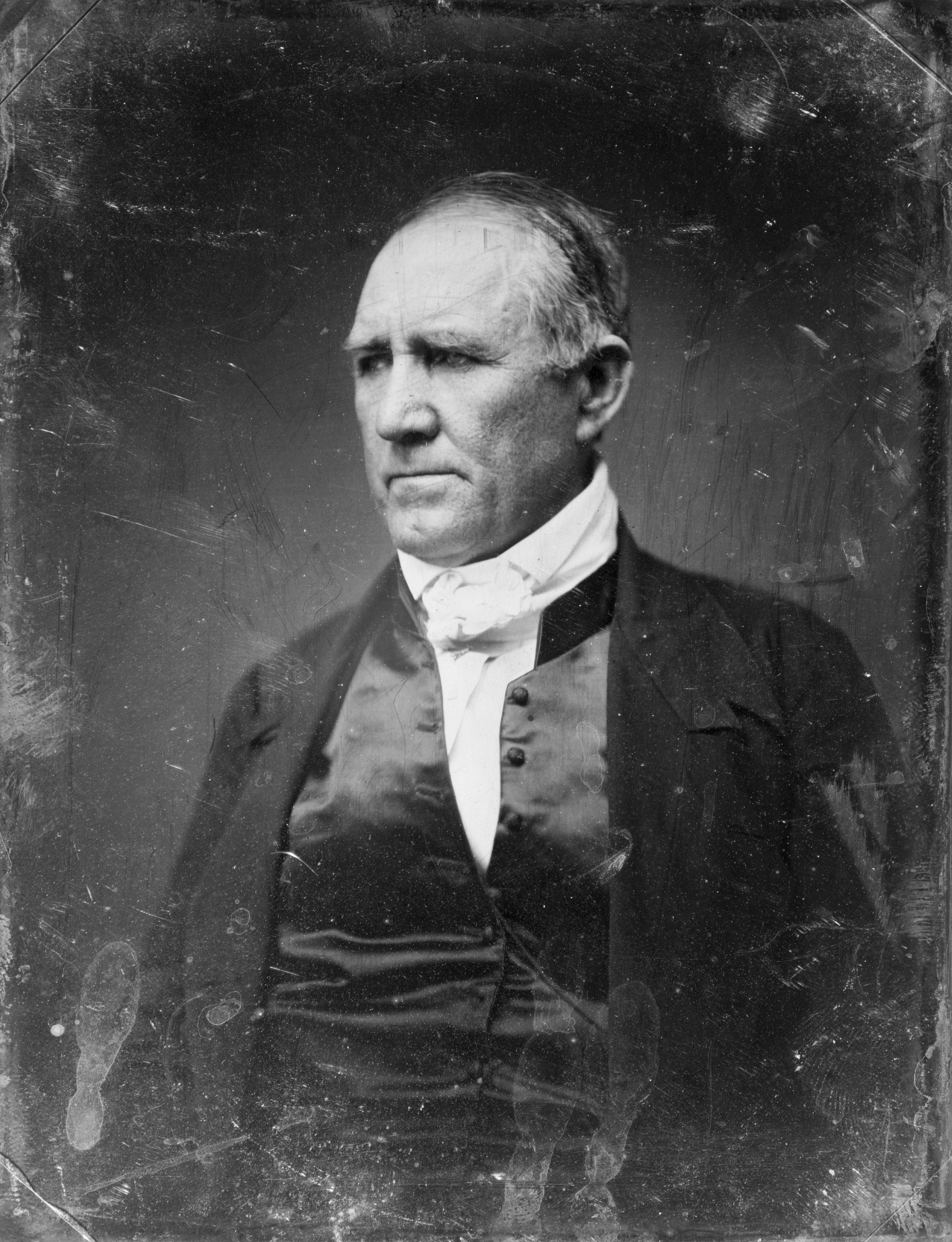
Sam Houston

- Richard Andrews (1797?–1835), first Texan killed during the Texas Revolution
- James Bowie (1796–1836), frontiersman, died at Battle of the Alamo
- William Joel Bryan (1815–1903), soldier in Texas Revolution, landowner
- Edward Burleson (1798–1851), lieutenant colonel during Texas Revolution, later Vice President of Republic of Texas
- John Coker (1789–1851), hero of San Jacinto
- Davy Crockett (1786–1836), frontiersman and U.S. congressman from Tennessee, died at Alamo
- Almaron Dickinson (1800–1836), Texian soldier, died at Alamo
- James Fannin (c. 1804–1836), key figure during Texas Revolution
- Thomas Green (1814–1864), artillery officer at San Jacinto, brigadier general in Confederate Army
- Sam Houston (1793–1863), commander of victorious Texian Army at the Battle of San Jacinto, which won independence for Texas
- Henry Karnes (1812–1840), soldier and commander in Texas Revolution
- Robert J. Kleberg (1803–1888), veteran of Battle of San Jacinto; descendants owned and managed King Ranch
- Antonio Menchaca (1800–1879), soldier in the Texas Army; he helped convince Houston to allow Tejanos to fight in the battle of San Jacinto
- Benjamin Milam (1788–1835), commander in Texas Revolution
- Emily West Morgan (c. 1815–1891), indentured servant known as "The Yellow Rose of Texas" who, legend has it, helped win Texas Revolution
- Juan Seguín (1806–1890), Tejano soldier during Texas Revolution
- John William Smith (1792–1845), fought at Battle of San Jacinto; later first mayor of San Antonio
- Alfonso Steele (1817–1911), last survivor of Battle of San Jacinto
- William B. Travis (1809–1836), commander of Texas forces at Alamo
- Logan Vandeveer (1815–1855), hero of San Jacinto
- William A. A. "Bigfoot" Wallace (1817–1899), Texas Ranger who fought in Texas Revolution, Mexican–American War, Civil War

=== Mexican–American War ===
- William J. Worth (1794–1849), major general; Fort Worth, Texas, and several other places were named for him

=== American Civil War ===
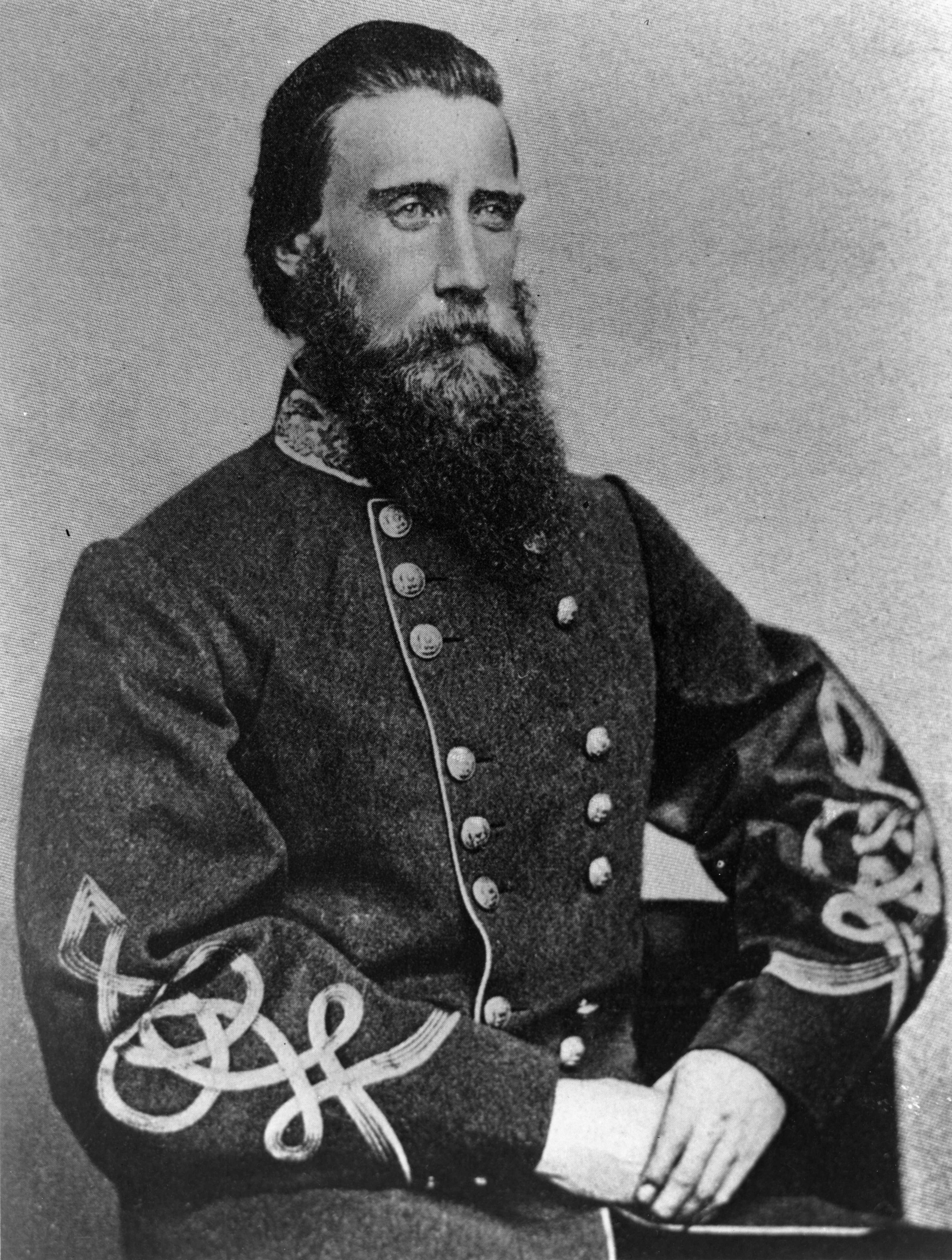
John Bell Hood

- John Baylor (1822–1894), Confederate colonel, politician, military governor of Arizona Territory
- John Henry Brown (1820–1895), Confederate officer, served on staffs of two generals
- Nicholas Henry Darnell (1807–1885), leader of 18th Texas Cavalry Regiment, known as "Darnell's Regiment"; Speaker of House for both Republic of Texas and state of Texas
- Edmund J. Davis (1827–1883), Union general and 14th governor of Texas
- Dick Dowling (1838–1867), commander at Sabine Pass and famous Houstonian
- John "Rip" Ford (1815–1897), Texas Rangers legend and commander at Battle of Palmito Ranch
- John L. Haynes (1821–1888), Union soldier in 1st Texas Cavalry Regiment
- Milton M. Holland (1844–1910), Union soldier, won Medal of Honor
- John Bell Hood (1831–1879), commander of Hood's Texas Brigade and Confederate general
- Samuel Ealy Johnson Sr. (1838–1915), soldier, grandfather of U.S. President Lyndon Baines Johnson
- Albert Sidney Johnston (1803–1862), Confederate general and commander of Confederate western forces
- John J. Kennedy (1813–1880), Confederate cavalry officer, ended Regulator-Moderator War
- John B. Magruder (1807–1871), Confederate general at Battle of Galveston
- Benjamin McCulloch (1811–1862), soldier in Texas Revolution, Texas Ranger, U.S. Marshal, and brigadier general for Confederate States of America
- Henry Eustace McCulloch (1816–1895), soldier in Texas Revolution, Texas Ranger, and brigadier general for Confederate States of America
- William Henry Parsons (1826–1907), colonel, Twelfth Texas Cavalry; newspaper editor, legislator
- Felix Huston Robertson (1839–1928), only Confederate general who was native-born Texan
- Lawrence Sullivan "Sul" Ross (1838–1898), Confederate general, governor of Texas, president of Texas A&M University, namesake of Sul Ross State University
- William Read Scurry (1821–1864), Confederate general at Battle of Glorieta Pass
- Pleasant Tackitt (1803–1886), Confederate officer and county official at Fort Belknap; a founder of Parker County
- Charles S. West (1829–1885), Confederate officer and judge advocate general for Trans-Mississippi Department
- Louis T. Wigfall (1816–1874), Confederate general and senator from Texas, secured surrender of Fort Sumter

=== World War I ===
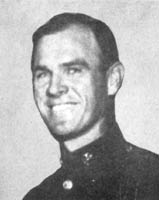
David E. Hayden

- Charles Gray Catto (1896–1972), flying ace credited with eight aerial victories
- Daniel R. Edwards (1897–1967), received Medal of Honor
- William S. Graves (1895–1940), commander of US forces in Siberia during the allied intervention in Russia
- David E. Hayden (1897–1974), Navy corpsman, Medal of Honor recipient
- Robert Lee Howze (1864–1926), major general of 38th Infantry Division, commander of Third Army of Occupation of Germany, Medal of Honor recipient
- Louis Jordan (1890–1918), 1914 All American, first US Army officer from Texas to be killed in action during World War I
- William Thomas Ponder (1893–1947), flying ace credited with six aerial victories
- Marcelino Serna (1896–1992), Army private, first Hispanic to be awarded the Distinguished Service Cross
- Edgar Gardner Tobin (1896–1954), flying ace credited with six aerial victories

=== World War II ===
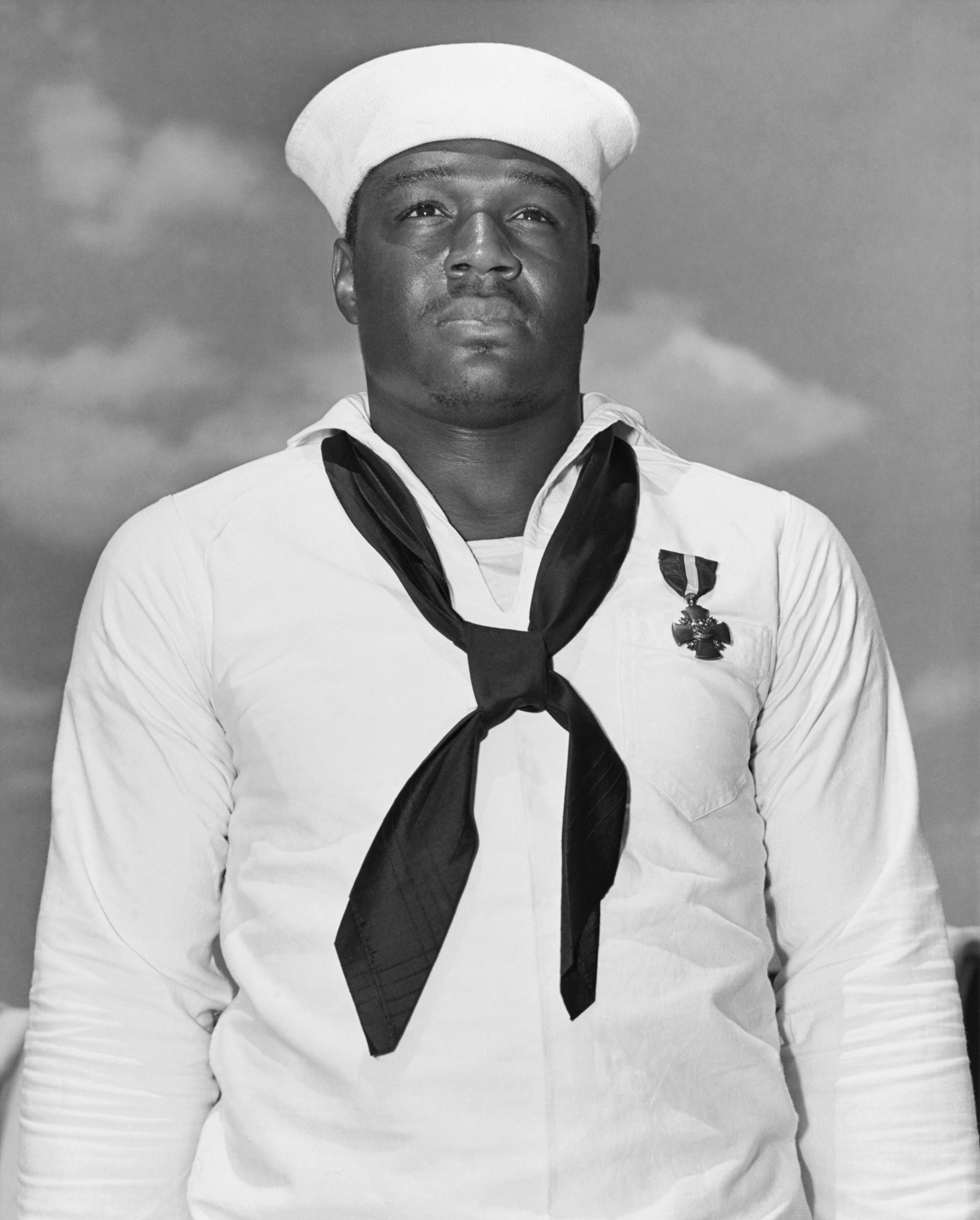
Doris Miller

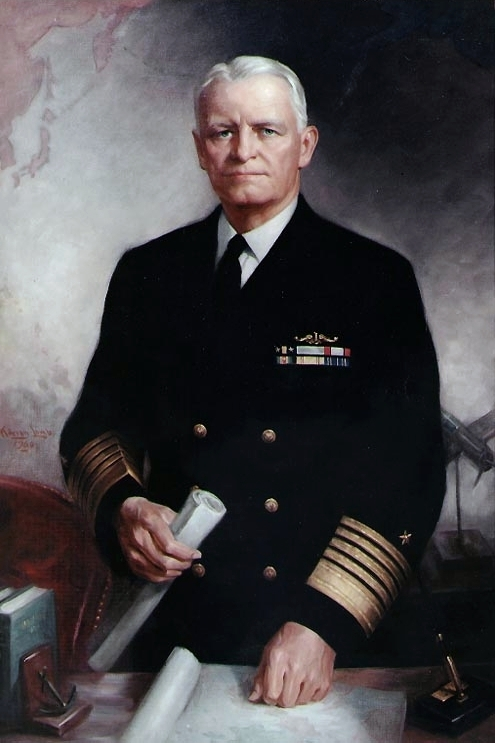
Chester Nimitz

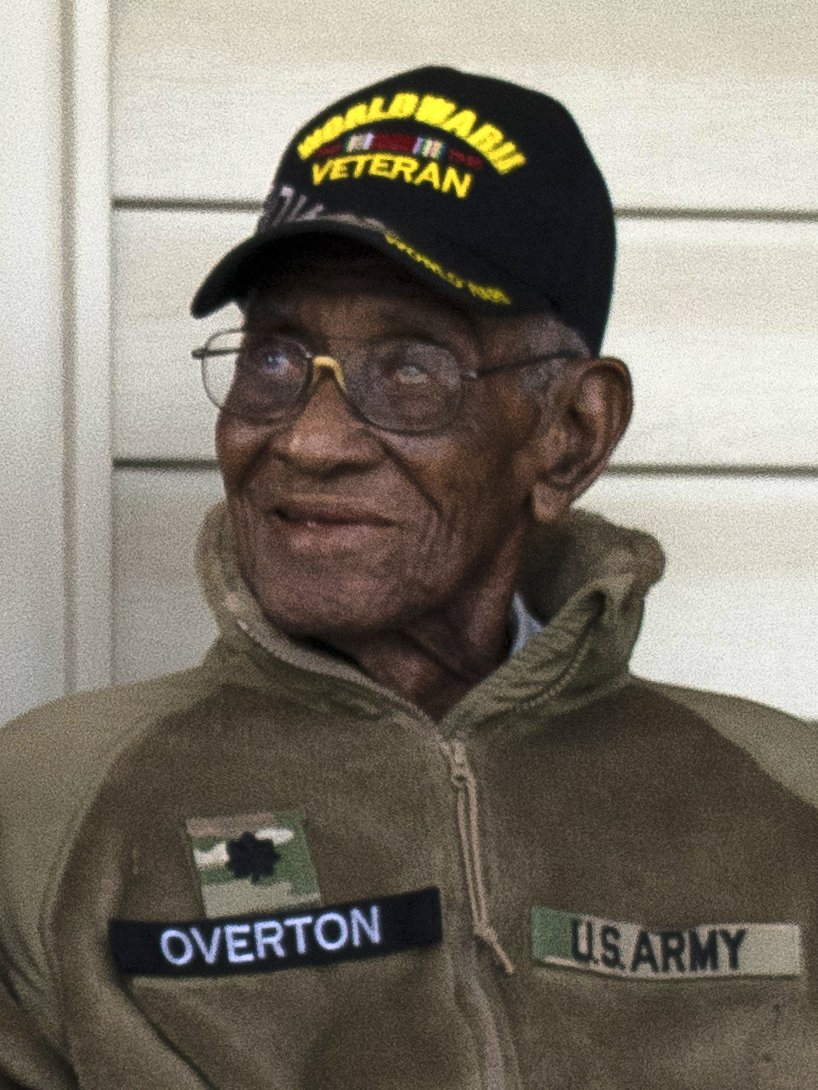
Richard Arvin Overton

- Harlon Block (1924–1945), raised flag on Mt. Suribachi at Iwo Jima
- Romus Burgin (1922–2019), U.S. Marine, author
- Charles P. Cabell (1903–1971), U.S. Air Force general; later deputy director of Central Intelligence Agency
- Horace S. Carswell Jr. (1916–1944), Army Air Corps major, awarded Medal of Honor
- Claire Chennault (1893–1958), commander of "Flying Tigers"
- Robert G. Cole (1915–1944), soldier, won Medal of Honor for role in D-Day Normandy invasion
- Samuel David Dealey (1906–1944), U.S. Navy submarine commander, received Medal of Honor and other distinctions for valor
- Dwight D. Eisenhower (1890–1969), Supreme Allied Commander WWII and 34th president of the U.S.
- Ira C. Eaker (1896–1987), commander of Eighth Air Force in World War II
- Calvin Graham (1930–1992), youngest US serviceman of World War II
- David Lee "Tex" Hill (1915–2007), fighter pilot, flying ace
- Oveta Culp Hobby (1905–1995), colonel in Women's Army Corps, first secretary of Department of Health, Education and Welfare
- James L. Holloway Jr. (1898–1984), U.S. Navy four-star admiral; Superintendent of U.S. Naval Academy
- Neel E. Kearby (1911–1944), fighter ace, Medal of Honor recipient
- Raymond L. Knight (1922–1945), aviator, Medal of Honor recipient
- Turney W. Leonard (1921–1944), Army officer, received Medal of Honor
- Felix Z. Longoria Jr. (1920–1945), Hispanic soldier KIA in the Philippines whose burial was refused in hometown, causing statewide debate
- Glenn McDuffie (1927–2014), sailor featured kissing nurse in Alfred Eisenstaedt's iconic photograph V-J Day in Times Square
- Doris Miller (1919–1943), Pearl Harbor hero, first African American to receive Navy Cross
- Audie Murphy (1924–1971), World War II hero, actor, Medal of Honor Recipient
- Chester Nimitz (1885–1966), commander of Allied naval forces in Pacific during World War II
- Richard Arvin Overton (1906–2018), U.S. Army sergeant; from May 2016 until his death was the oldest surviving American military veteran
- Bruce Palmer Jr. (1913–2000), U.S. Army officer, chief of Staff of the United States Army during Vietnam War
- John L. Pierce (1895–1959), U.S. Army brigadier general
- Cleto Rodríguez (1923–1990), U.S. Army soldier, received Medal of Honor; a freeway in San Antonio is named in his honor
- James Earl Rudder (1910–1970), D-Day commander of the U.S. Army 2nd Ranger Battalion, which stormed cliffs at Pointe du Hoc
- William H. Simpson (1888–1980), commander of U.S. Ninth Army in European Theater
- Lucian K. Truscott (1895–1965), U.S. Army general who held successive commands in European Theater
- Edwin Walker (1909–1993), U.S. Army major general known for conservative views and attempted assassination target for Lee Harvey Oswald
- Walton Walker (1889–1950), U.S. Army general who served under Patton in European Theater and later in Korean War

=== Korean War ===
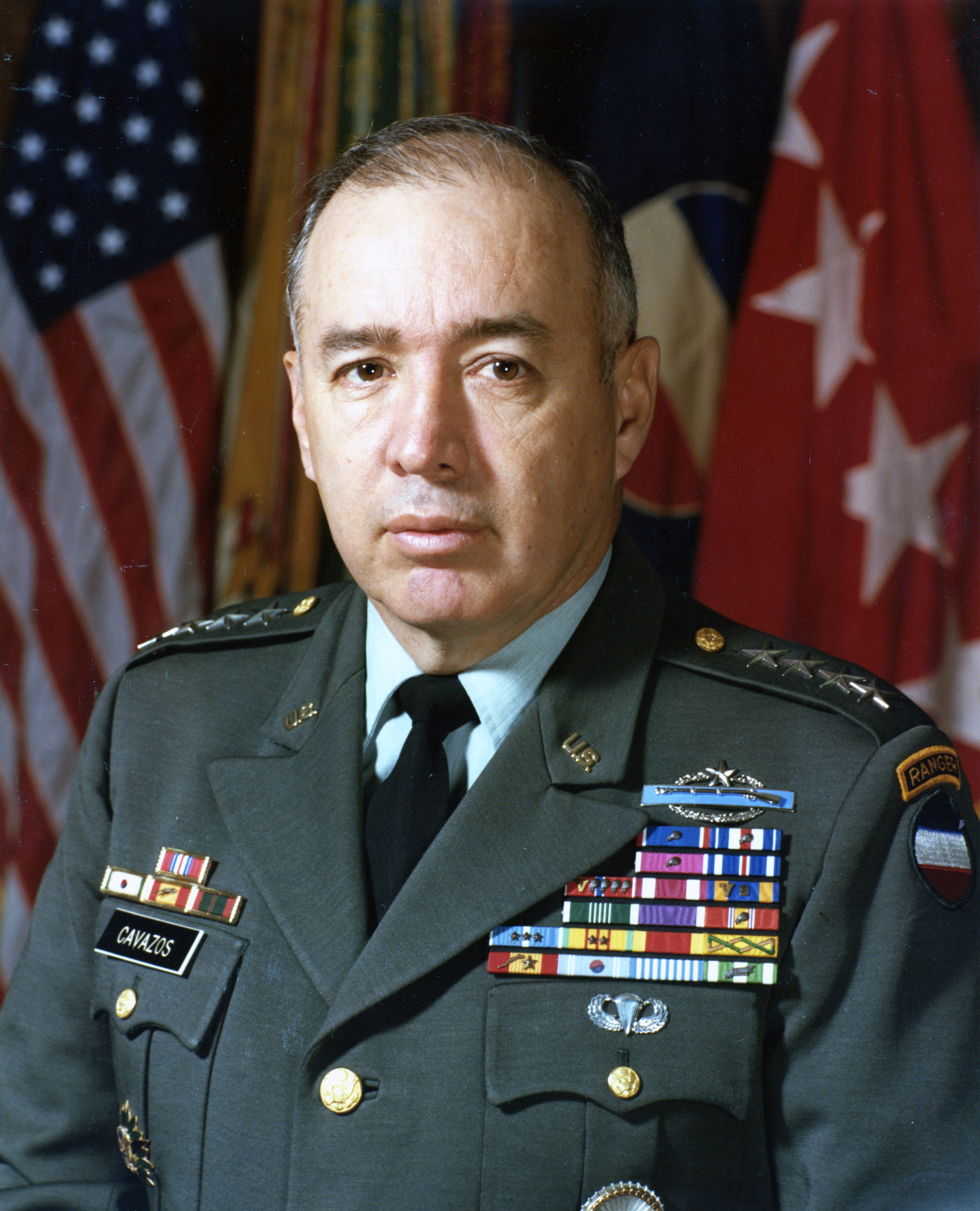
Richard E. Cavazos

- Richard E. Cavazos (1929–2017), first Hispanic four-star general in U.S. Army, earned two Distinguished Service Crosses
- Charles F. Pendleton (1931–1953), awarded Medal of Honor
- Oliver P. Smith (1893–1977), U.S. Marine Corps general noted for his leadership in Battle of Chosin Reservoir
- Edwin Walker (1909–1993), U.S. Army major general, attempted assassination target of Lee Harvey Oswald
- Walton Walker (1889–1950), U.S. Army general, first commander of U.S. Eighth Army during Korean War

=== Vietnam War ===
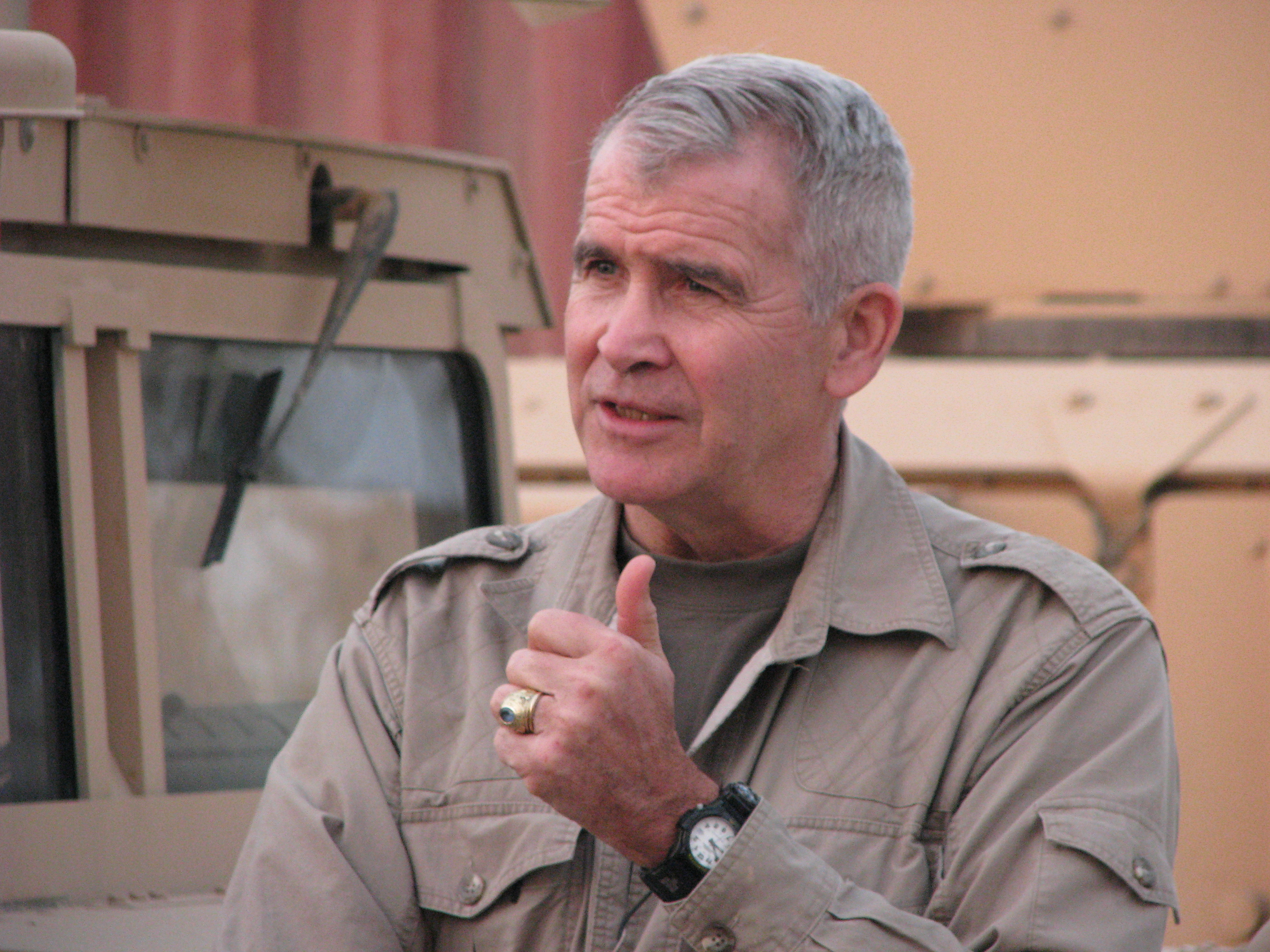
Oliver North

- Raul (Roy) Perez Benavidez (1935–1998), awarded Medal of Honor for actions in South Vietnam
- Steven Logan Bennett (1946–1972), captain in United States Air Force, received Medal of Honor Posthumously for actions in Vietnam
- Alfredo Cantu Gonzalez (1946–1968), sergeant, USMC, Medal of Honor recipient
- Fred E. Haynes Jr. (1921–2010), major general, USMC
- David H. McNerney (1931–2010), 1st sergeant U.S. Army, Medal of Honor, Vietnam 1967
- Oliver North (born 1943), lieutenant-colonel, USMC (retired), NRA board member and founder of the Freedom Alliance
- Chester M. Ovnand (1914–1959), master sergeant, U.S. Army, second American killed in Vietnam War
- Bruce Palmer Jr. (1913–2000), U.S. Army officer, chief of staff of the United States Army during Vietnam War
- Alfred M. Wilson (1948–1969), Marine private first class awarded Medal of Honor posthumously

=== Somali Civil War ===
- William F. Garrison (born 1944), major general, commander of United States Army forces during Operation Gothic Serpent

=== War in Afghanistan ===
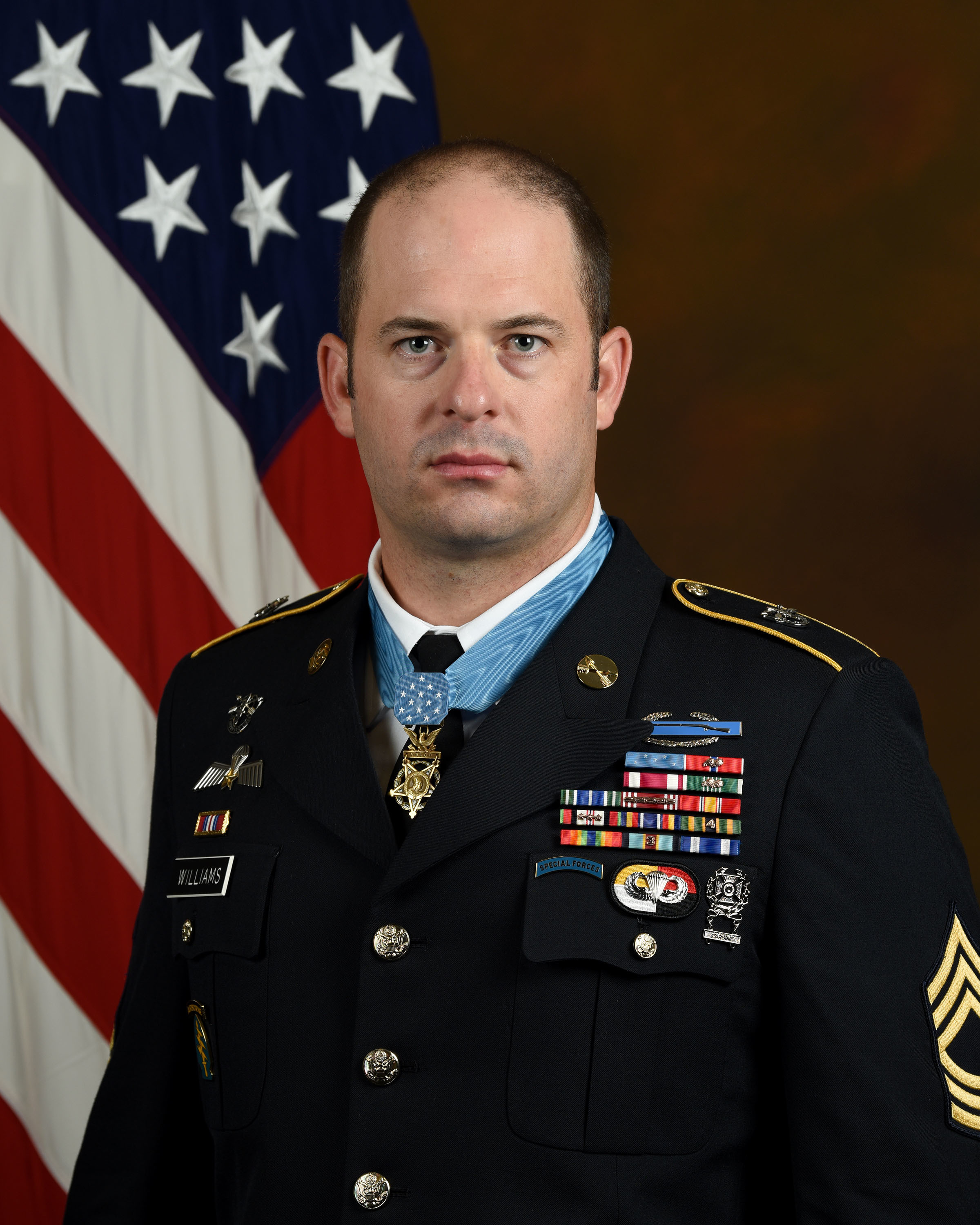
Matthew O. Williams

- Marcus Luttrell (born 1975), U.S. Navy SEAL, was awarded the Navy Cross for actions in conflicts with Taliban
- William H. McRaven (born 1955), U.S. Navy admiral and SEAL, led planning for Operation Neptune Spear
- Patrick M. Walsh (born 1955), U.S. Navy admiral, commander of U.S. Pacific Fleet
- Billy Waugh (1929–2023), U.S. Army Special Forces, Studies and Observations Group
- Matthew O. Williams (born 1981), U.S. Army sergeant major, Medal of Honor recipient

=== Iraq War ===
- Eric Alva (born 1970), first Marine seriously injured in the Iraq War; later worked for repeal of Don't ask, don't tell
- Chris Kyle (1974–2013), U.S. Navy SEAL who fought in the Second Battle of Fallujah
- Kristian Menchaca (1983–2006), U.S. Army soldier who was captured and executed

=== War on Terror ===
- Clint Lorance (born 1984), Army first lieutenant convicted of second-degree murder for battlefield deaths; pardoned
- Michael L. Oates (born 1957), Army lieutenant general

=== Intelligence ===
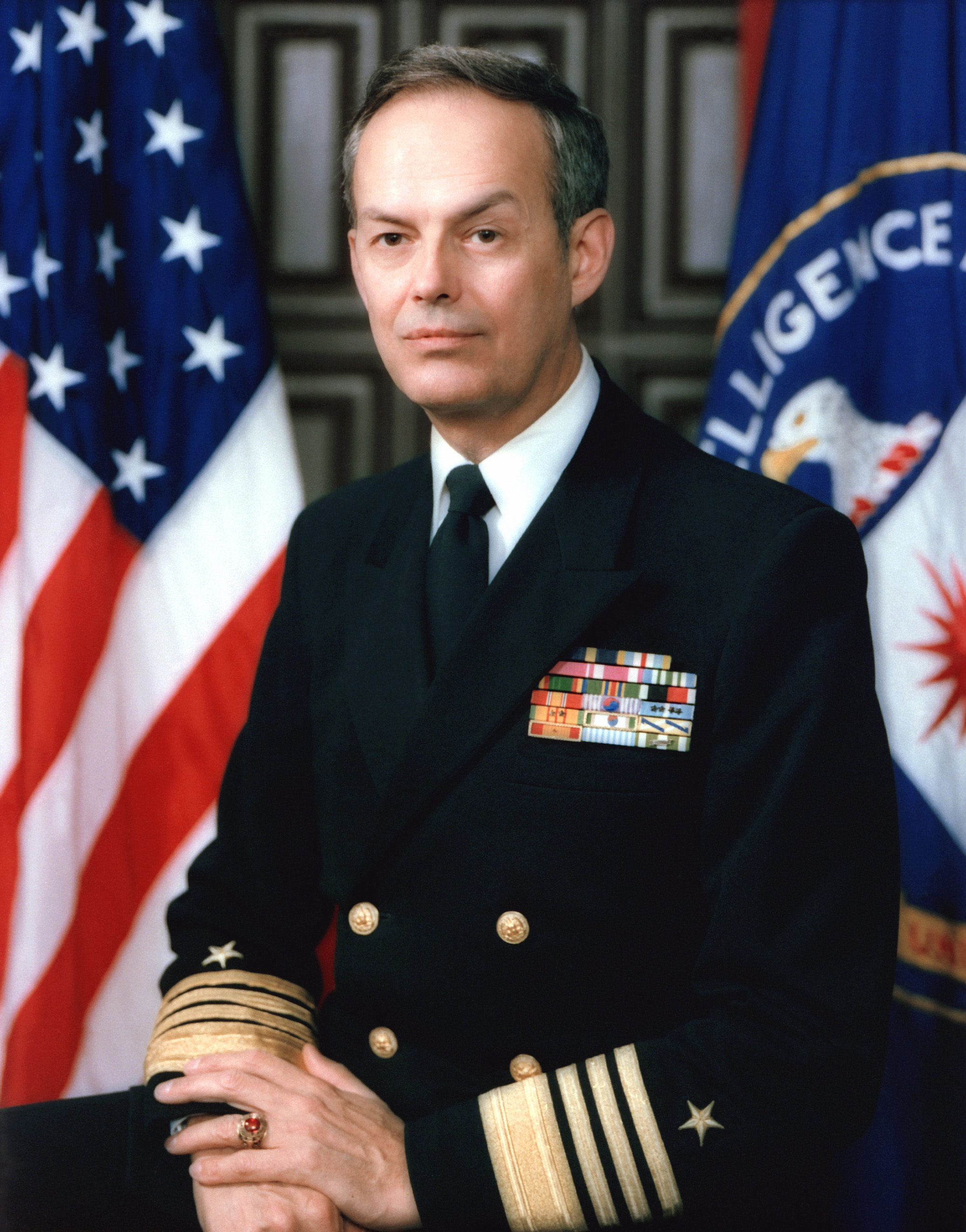
Bobby Ray Inman

- Bobby Ray Inman (1931–2026), U.S. Navy admiral, director of National Security Agency, deputy director of Central Intelligence Agency

=== Other ===
- Robert T. Clark (born 1948), U.S. Army lieutenant general, commanded United States Army North (ARNORTH)
- Robert L. Rutherford (1938–2013), U.S. Air Force general, commander of United States Transportation Command and Pacific Air Forces
- Alfred Valenzuela (born 1948), U.S. Army major general, commanded United States Army South (USARSO)

== Politics and public office ==
See also Category:Texas politicians and its subcategories.
See also List of mayors of Austin, Texas; List of mayors of Dallas, Texas; List of mayors of El Paso, Texas; List of mayors of Fort Worth, Texas; List of mayors of Houston, Texas; List of mayors of Plano, Texas; List of mayors of San Antonio, Texas.

A

- Greg Abbott (born 1957), governor of Texas, former Attorney General
- Fred Agnich (1913–2004), Texas state representative, member of "Dirty 30" in 1971; oilman, rancher, conservationist
- Elsa Alcala (born 1964), judge of Texas Court of Criminal Appeals from Houston since 2011
- Elizabeth Alexander (born 1979), press secretary for Vice President Joe Biden
- Bruce Alger (1918–2015), Republican U.S. representative for Texas's 5th congressional district, based in Dallas County, 1955–1965
- Rodney Anderson (born 1968), former member of Texas House of Representatives from Grand Prairie
- Betty Andujar (1912–1997), first Republican woman to serve in Texas State Senate (1973–1983); Pennsylvania native
- Bob Armstrong (1932–2015), member of Texas House of Representatives for Travis County 1963–71; commissioner of General Land Office 1971–83

B

- Ben Barnes (born 1938), lieutenant governor of Texas (1969–1973); youngest House Speaker in Texas history (1965–1969)
- Ray Barnhart (1928–2013), state representative and director of Federal Highway Administration under President Reagan
- Decimus et Ultimus Barziza (1838–1882), state representative, Harris County, 1874–1876, businessman, Civil War soldier
- Robert Emmett Bledsoe Baylor (1793–1874), district judge, a framer of Texas Constitution; co-founded Baylor University
- Tina Benkiser (born 1962), former chairman of Republican Party of Texas
- Lloyd Bentsen (1921–2006), U.S. representative and U.S. senator
- Leo Berman (1936–2015), former state representative from Tyler
- Jeremy Bernard (born 1961), White House social secretary
- Paul Bettencourt (born 1958), Republican member of Texas State Senate from Houston
- Teel Bivins (1947–2009), state senator from Amarillo and U.S. ambassador to Sweden
- Bill Blythe (born 1935), Houston realtor and Republican state representative from Harris County, 1971–1983
- Elton Bomer (born 1935), state representative from Anderson County and Texas secretary of state
- Henry Bonilla (born 1954), U.S. representative from San Antonio
- Greg Bonnen (born 1966), neurosurgeon and state representative from Galveston County; brother of Dennis Bonnen
- Jeffrey S. Boyd (born 1961), associate justice of Texas Supreme Court since 2012
- Wally Brewster (born 1960), U.S. ambassador to Dominican Republic
- John A. Brieden III (born 1955), politician and National Commander of The American Legion, 2003–2004
- Stephen Broden (born 1952), politician, professor, businessman, activist
- Esther Buckley (1948–2013), member of United States Commission on Civil Rights; educator in Laredo
- Albert S. Burleson (1863–1937), U.S. postmaster general and congressman
- Edward Burleson (1798–1851), Texas soldier, general, and statesman
- Joel Burns (born 1969), Fort Worth city councilman who spoke out against bullying of LGBT youth
- Konni Burton (born 1963), member of Texas Senate from Tarrant County
- Jeb Bush (born 1953), former governor of Florida, reared in Midland and Houston
- Angie Chen Button (born 1954), Republican member of Texas House of Representatives from Dallas County

C

- Frank Kell Cahoon (1934–2013), Midland oilman and Republican former state representative
- Briscoe Cain (born 1984), Republican member of Texas House of Representatives for Harris County District 128, effective January 2017
- Bill Callegari (born 1941), Republican member of Texas House of Representatives from Harris County, 2001–2015
- Donna Campbell (born 1954), Texas state senator and physician from New Braunfels
- Glenn Canfield, Jr. (born 1935), Republican chairman of Gregg County, 1991–2002, Longview
- Francisco Canseco (born 1949), former U.S. representative from San Antonio
- John Carona (born 1955), state senator from Dallas County, 1996–2015
- Stefani Carter (born 1978), member of Texas House of Representatives from Dallas County since 2011; first African-American female Republican to serve in state House
- Carlos Cascos (1952–2024), secretary of state of Texas in Abbott administration
- Henry E. Catto Jr. (1930–2011), U.S. diplomat, businessman
- Lauro Cavazos (1927–2022), U.S. secretary of education in the George H. W. Bush administration, first Hispanic U.S. cabinet officer
- Wayne Christian (born 1950), Republican former state representative from Center and Nacogdoches; candidate for Texas Railroad Commission in 2014
- Henry Cisneros (born 1947), former mayor of San Antonio and U.S. secretary of Housing and Urban Development
- Ronald H. Clark (born 1953), federal judge; former member of Texas House of Representatives
- Tom C. Clark (1899–1977), U.S. attorney general and associate justice of Supreme Court of the United States
- David Cobb (born 1962), 2004 U.S. presidential candidate for Green Party
- Cathy Cochran (1944–2021), retiring judge of Texas Court of Criminal Appeals
- Susan Combs (born 1945), Texas comptroller and agriculture commissioner, state representative
- John B. Connally Jr. (1917–1993), secretary of the Navy, governor of Texas, U.S. treasury secretary
- John Cornyn (born 1952), United States senator since 2002
- Tom Craddick (born 1943), member of Texas House of Representatives from Midland; former Speaker
- Juanita Craft (1902–1985), Dallas city council member, civil rights activist
- Brandon Creighton (born 1970), member of Texas House of Representatives from Conroe; House Majority Leader (2013), attorney, businessman, and rancher
- Ted Cruz (born 1971), Canadian-born politician, Texas senator since 2013, and former 2016 presidential candidate
- Henry Cuellar (born 1955), U.S. representative from Texas's 28th congressional district; native of Laredo

D–F

- Tony Dale (born 1969), Republican member of Texas House of Representatives from Williamson County since 2013
- Price Daniel (1910–1988), Democratic US senator and 38th governor of Texas
- Nicholas Henry Darnell (1807–1885), Speaker of House for both Republic of Texas and state of Texas
- John E. Davis (born 1960), Republican member of Texas House of Representatives from Houston since 1999
- Wendy Davis (born 1963), Texas state senator from Tarrant County, Democratic gubernatorial nominee in 2014
- Jay Dean (born 1953), mayor of Longview, 2005–2015; state representative for Gregg and Upshur counties, effective 2017
- David Dewhurst (born 1945), lieutenant governor of Texas, 2003–2015
- Charles Duncan Jr. (1926–2022), U.S. deputy secretary of defense 1977–1979, secretary of energy 1979–1981
- Gary Elkins (1955–2025), Republican member of Texas House of Representatives from Houston since 1995
- Pat Fallon (born 1967), member of Texas House of Representatives from Denton County
- Marsha Farney (born 1958), state representative from Williamson County since 2013; member of the Texas State Board of Education 2011–2013; businesswoman and former educator
- James E. "Pa" Ferguson (1871–1944), governor of Texas (1915–1917), impeached, convicted, and removed from office
- Miriam "Ma" Ferguson (1875–1961), first female governor of Texas
- Mindy Finn (born 1980), media strategist, conservative feminist activist, independent U.S. vice presidential candidate in 2016
- Charles R. Floyd (1881–1945), Texas state senator, state representative, and co-founder of Paris Junior College
- Dan Flynn (1943–2022), Republican member of Texas House of Representatives from Van Zandt County
- Aaron Ford (born 1972), Nevada Attorney General since 2019
- James Frank (born 1967), member of Texas House of Representatives from Wichita Falls

G

- Rick Galindo (born 1981), Republican member of Texas House of Representatives from District 117 in Bexar County, effective 2015
- Pete Gallego (born 1961), U.S. representative from Texas's 23rd congressional district
- H. S. "Buddy" Garcia (born 1967), former interim 2012 member of Texas Railroad Commission
- John Nance Garner (1868–1967), 44th Speaker of the US House and 32nd Vice President of the United States
- Tony Garza (born 1958), former U.S. ambassador to Mexico
- Charlie Geren (born 1949), member of Texas House of Representatives from his native Fort Worth
- Pete Geren (born 1952), former member of United States House of Representatives from Texas's 12th congressional district and U.S. secretary of the Army
- Craig Goldman (born 1968), member of Texas House of Representatives from his native Fort Worth
- Alberto Gonzales (born 1955), United States Attorney General
- Henry B. Gonzalez (1916–2000), U.S. representative from San Antonio
- John W. Goode (1923–1994), Republican lawyer from San Antonio; lost 1961 House race to Henry B. Gonzalez
- Austan Goolsbee (born 1969), chairperson of Council of Economic Advisers under President Barack Obama
- Tony Goolsby (1933–2020), Republican member of Texas House of Representatives from Dallas County, 1989–2009
- Blake Gottesman (born 1980), aide to President George W. Bush
- Phil Gramm (born 1942), former United States senator
- Tom Greenwell (1956–2013)
- Jesse Edward Grinstead (1866–1948), one-time mayor of Kerrville and state legislator
- Henry C. Grover (1927–2005), state legislator, 1972 Republican gubernatorial nominee

H–I

- Bob Hall (born 1942), Texas state senator from Van Zandt County
- Rick Hardcastle (born 1956), Republican former member of Texas House from Wilbarger County
- Will Ford Hartnett (born 1956), Dallas lawyer and Republican member of Texas House, 1991–2013
- Talmadge L. Heflin (born 1940), former state representative from Harris County, director of Center for Fiscal Policy at Texas Public Policy Foundation
- Glenn Hegar (born 1970), state senator and Republican candidate for state comptroller in 2014
- Jeb Hensarling (born 1957), U.S. representative
- Harvey Hilderbran (born 1960), state representative from Kerrville; Republican candidate for state comptroller in 2014
- Jim Hogg (1851–1906), first native Texan to become governor of Texas
- Vernon Edgar Howard (1937–1998), representative of the Texas House of Representatives, 1969–1975
- Dan Huberty (born 1968), Republican member of Texas House of Representatives from Harris County
- Joan Huffman (born 1956), former Houston criminal court judge; Republican member of Texas State Senate
- Bryan Hughes (born 1969), Republican member of Texas House of Representatives from Wood County
- Swanee Hunt (born 1950), U.S. ambassador
- Robert Dean Hunter (1928–2023), member of Texas House of Representatives from Abilene, 1986–2007
- Todd A. Hunter (born 1953), state representative, 1989–1997, 2009–present
- Thad Hutcheson (1915–1986), Houston lawyer and Republican politician
- Kay Bailey Hutchison (born 1943), first woman U.S. senator from Texas, 1993–2013
- Frank N. Ikard (1913–1991), U.S. representative from Texas's 13th congressional district, 1951–1961
- Sarah Isgur (born 1982), attorney and political analyst

J–L

- Alphonso Jackson (born 1945), U.S. secretary of Housing and Urban Development under President George W. Bush
- Wallace B. Jefferson (born 1963), chief justice of Supreme Court of Texas; resigned 2013
- Elizabeth Ames Jones (born 1956), former Texas Railroad Commissioner, member of Texas House of Representatives
- Gina Ortiz Jones (born 1981), U.S. under Secretary of the Air Force and mayor of San Antonio since 2025
- Jesse H. Jones (1874–1956), U.S. secretary of commerce under President Franklin D. Roosevelt
- Barbara Jordan (1936–1996), member of United States House of Representatives
- Rudy Juedeman (1908–2004), Odessa businessman and Republican politician
- Kyle Kacal (born 1969), Republican member of Texas House of Representatives from District 12
- David S. Kaufman (1813–1851), only Jew from Texas to serve in U.S. House of Representatives (1846–1851) before 1970s
- Bill Keffer (born 1958), Dallas lawyer who served in Texas House (District 107), 2003–2007
- Jim Keffer (born 1953), Eastland businessman and current Republican member of Texas House (District 60); brother of Bill Keffer
- Isaac Herbert Kempner (1873–1967), mayor of Galveston, founder of Imperial Sugar
- Mark Keough (born 1953), Republican member of Texas House of Representatives from The Woodlands in Montgomery County
- Ken King (born 1971), Republican member of Texas House of Representatives from Canadian in Hemphill County
- Ron Kirk (born 1954), United States Trade Representative; former Texas secretary of state, former mayor of Dallas
- Lois Kolkhorst (born 1964), member of Texas House of Representatives from Washington County since 2001
- Linda Koop (born 1950), member of Texas House from Dallas County; former member of the Dallas City Council
- Bob Krueger (1935–2022), former U.S. ambassador, U.S. senator and congressman (New Braunfels, Comal County)
- Dan Kubiak (1938–1998), state representative, businessman, educator
- Barbara Lee (born 1946), U.S. Representative from California (1998–2025) and Mayor of Oakland since 2025
- Debra Lehrmann (born 1956), Texas Supreme Court justice, elected 2010
- Eugene M. Locke (1918–1972), ambassador to Pakistan, deputy ambassador to South Vietnam, was awarded Presidential Medal of Freedom; candidate for governor of Texas
- J. M. Lozano (born 1980), member of Texas House of Representatives from Kingsville; native of Mexico
- Lanham Lyne (born 1955), mayor of Wichita Falls, state representative 2011–13

M

- George H. Mahon (1900–1985), U.S. representative from Texas's 19th congressional district 1935 until 1979
- Charles R. Matthews (born 1939), former Texas Railroad Commissioner and chancellor-emeritus of Texas State University System
- Jim Mattox (1943–2008), U.S. representative and attorney general of Texas
- Maury Maverick (1895–1954), Democratic U.S. representative
- Glen Maxey (born 1952), state representative from Austin
- Ruth McClendon (1943–2017), Democratic member of Texas House of Representatives from San Antonio since 1996
- Don McLeroy (born 1946), former chairman and member of Texas State Board of Education; dentist, young-earth creationist
- Tom Mechler (born 1956), Texas Republican state chairman since 2015; oil and gas consultant in Amarillo
- Will Metcalf (born 1984), state representative from Montgomery County since 2015
- Rick Miller (born 1946), member of Texas House of Representatives from Sugar Land; former Republican party chairman in Fort Bend County
- Hilmar Moore (1920–2012), mayor of Richmond, 1949–2012, longest tenure of any elected official in U.S. history
- William T. "Bill" Moore (1918–1999), state senator from Bryan, known as "Bull of the Brazos" and "father of the modern Texas A&M University"
- Robert Morrow (born 1964), chairman of Republican Party of Travis County since 2016; considered a conspiracy theorist
- Azie Taylor Morton (1936–2003), Treasurer of the United States
- Steve Munisteri (born 1957), chairman of Republican Party of Texas, 2010–2015
- Jim Murphy (born 1957), Republican member of Texas House of Representatives from District 133 in Houston, 2007–2009 and since 2011

N–O

- David Newell (born 1971), judge of Texas Court of Criminal Appeals, Place 9; Houston attorney
- James Robertson Nowlin (born 1937), U.S. district judge for Western District of Texas; one of first two Republicans since Reconstruction to represent Bexar County in Texas House of Representatives
- James E. Nugent (1922–2016), former Democratic member of Texas Railroad Commission and the Texas House of Representatives
- W. Lee "Pappy" O'Daniel (1890–1969), governor of Texas and U.S. senator
- Tom Oliverson (born 1972), anesthesiologist, Republican member of Texas House of Representatives
- Dora Olivo (born 1943), attorney and former member of Texas House of Representatives for Fort Bend County
- Bill Owens (born 1950), former governor of Colorado
- Alvin M. Owsley (1888–1967), diplomat

P

- Susan Pamerleau (born 1946), retired United States Air Force major general and Republican sheriff of Bexar County, first woman elected to that position, 2012
- Hugh Q. Parmer (1939–2020), former mayor of Fort Worth and member of both houses of Texas State Legislature
- Brad Parscale (born 1976), political strategist
- Dan Patrick (born 1950), lieutenant governor of Texas, former member of Texas State Senate and radio broadcaster
- Diane Patrick (born 1946), former member of Texas House of Representatives from Arlingon
- Jerry E. Patterson (born 1946), Texas Land Commissioner; former state senator, candidate for lieutenant governor in 2014
- Thomas Pauken (born 1944), Texas Republican chairman, 1994–1997, lawyer and political commentator
- Gilbert Peña (born 1949), Republican member of Texas House of Representatives from Pasadena
- Rick Perry (born 1950), governor of Texas, 2000–15; U.S. secretary of energy
- Dade Phelan (born 1975), Republican state representative from Beaumont
- Larry Phillips (born 1966), Republican member of Texas House of Representatives from Sherman
- Thomas R. Phillips (born 1949), former chief justice of Texas Supreme Court
- Katrina Pierson (born 1976), Tea Party activist, Donald Trump campaign spokesperson
- Dan Pope (born 1963), mayor of Lubbock since 2016
- David J. Porter (born 1954), member of Railroad Commission of Texas, elected November 2, 2010
- Robert "Bob" Price (1927–2004), U.S. representative from Pampa in Texas Panhandle
- Tom Price (born 1945), judge of Texas Court of Criminal Appeals, 1997–2015, and the Dallas-based 282nd Court, 1987–1997
- Walter Thomas Price, IV (born 1968), state representative from Amarillo, first elected November 2, 2010
- Graham B. Purcell Jr. (1919–2011), U.S. representative from Texas's 13th congressional district, 1962–1973; Wichita Falls lawyer

R

- Jack Rains (1937–2023), former Texas secretary of state
- John N. Raney (born 1947), member of Texas House of Representatives from Brazos County since 2011
- Bennett Ratliff (born 1961), member of Texas House of Representative from Dallas County (2013–2015)
- Bill Ratliff (1936–2025), state senator and lieutenant governor from Mount Pleasant
- Sam Rayburn (1882–1961), U.S. congressman and Speaker of the House of Representatives
- Richard P. Raymond (born 1960), South Texas state representative
- Ron Reynolds (born 1973), Democratic member of Texas House of Representatives from District 27 in Missouri City
- Ann Richards (1933–2006), second woman governor of Texas (1991–1995); state treasurer (1983–1991)
- Cecile Richards (1957–2025), liberal political activist, daughter of Ann Richards
- Matt Rinaldi (born 1975), member of Texas House of Representatives from Dallas County since 2015
- Roy R. Rubottom Jr. (1912–2010), diplomat
- Jim Rudd (born 1943), lawyer and lobbyist in Austin; former Texas state representative from Brownfield

Sa–Sl

- Paul Sadler (born 1955), state representative, Democratic U.S. Senate nominee in 2012, lost to Republican Ted Cruz
- Pete Saenz (born 1951), mayor of Laredo
- Joe Sage (1920–1977), one of first two Republicans since Reconstruction to represent Bexar County in Texas House of Representatives
- Mario Marcel Salas (born 1949), civil rights activist, politician
- Tom Schieffer (born 1947), diplomat, brother of CBS anchorman Bob Schieffer
- Pete Sessions (born 1955), U.S. representative
- Sonal Shah (born 1968), economist and public official with Obama Administration
- John Sharp (born 1950), former Texas Comptroller of Public Accounts, chancellor of Texas A&M University
- J. D. Sheffield (born 1960), member of Texas House of Representatives from Coryell County since 2013; physician in Gatesville
- Mark M. Shelton (born 1956), pediatrician and member of Texas House of Representatives from District 97 (Fort Worth), 2009–2013
- David McAdams Sibley (born 1948), attorney-lobbyist, Texas state senator (1991–2002), mayor of Waco (1987–1988)
- Ron Simmons (born 1960), member of Texas House of Representatives from Carrollton since 2013
- Ryan Sitton (born 1975), Republican nominee for Texas Railroad Commission in 2014 general election

Sm–Sz

- Preston Smith (1912–2003), governor of Texas (1969–1973) and lieutenant governor (1963–1969)
- Steven Wayne Smith (born 1961), member of Texas Supreme Court (2002–2005)
- Wayne Smith (born 1943), member of Texas House of Representatives from District 128 in Harris County since 2003
- Barry Smitherman (born 1957), former member of Texas Railroad Commission; unsuccessful candidate for attorney general in 2014
- Clay Smothers (1935–2004), member of Texas House of Representatives; operator of St. Paul Industrial Training School orphanage in Malakoff; radio personality
- Burt Solomons (born 1950), Denton County lawyer and Republican member of Texas House of Representatives, 1995–2013
- Margaret Spellings (born 1957), U.S. secretary of education (2005–2009)
- Drew Springer Jr. (born 1966), member of the Texas House of Representatives from District 68 (North Texas and eastern South Plains)
- Barbara Staff (1924–2019), co-chairman of 1976 Ronald Reagan Texas presidential primary campaign
- Sylvia Stanfield (born 1943), diplomat
- Robert Stanton (born 1940), director of National Park Service
- Todd Staples (born 1963), Texas agriculture commissioner; candidate for lieutenant governor in 2014
- Max Starcke (1884–1972), mayor of Seguin, Texas; managing director of Lower Colorado River Authority
- Ken Starr (1946–2022), federal judge, Solicitor General, and Independent Counsel during Clinton Administration
- William Steger (1920–2006), U.S. district judge
- Jonathan Stickland (born 1983), member of Texas House of Representatives from Tarrant County since 2013
- Steve Stockman (born 1956), member of U.S. House of Representatives from Texas; candidate for Republican nomination for U.S. Senate in 2014
- Robert Schwarz Strauss (1918–2014), politician, chairman of Democratic National Committee, and diplomat
- Carole Keeton Strayhorn (1939–2025), Texas comptroller (1999–2007), railroad commissioner, former mayor of Austin
- Raymond Strother (1940–2022), political consultant, native of Port Arthur
- Michael Quinn Sullivan (born 1970), reporter, political activist, president of Texans for Fiscal Responsibility

T–V

- Robert Talton (born 1945), police officer, attorney, member of Texas House of Representatives from Harris County 1993–2009; candidate for chief justice of Texas Supreme Court in 2014 Republican primary
- Buddy Temple (1942–2015), businessman, state representative from Angelina County, and railroad commissioner
- Tony Tinderholt (born 1970), member of Texas House of Representatives from Arlington
- Raul Torres (born 1956), former state representative from Nueces County
- Steve Toth (born 1960), member of Texas House of Representatives, 2013–2015, from The Woodlands
- John G. Tower (1925–1991), first Republican U.S. senator from Texas since Reconstruction
- Lupe Valdez (born 1947), only female elected sheriff in Texas
- Gary VanDeaver (born 1958), Republican member of Texas House of Representatives from Bowie County, effective 2015
- Jason Villalba (born 1971), state representative from Dallas County since 2013; Dallas attorney with Haynes and Boone
- Catalina Vasquez Villalpando (born 1940), Treasurer of the United States

W–Z

- Dale Wainwright (born 1961), former associate justice of Texas Supreme Court
- Richard A. Waterfield (1939–2007), state representative who advocated for feeding programs for disabled and elderly
- Craig Watkins (1967–2023), first African-American district attorney in Texas, Dallas Morning News Texan of the Year 2008
- Reed N. Weisiger (1838–1908), Texas state senator (1891–1893), Confederate cavalry officer, pioneer in Victoria County
- Jack Wheeler (1944–2010), presidential aide to Ronald Reagan, George H. W. Bush, and George W. Bush administrations
- Molly S. White (born 1958), Republican member of Texas House of Representatives from Bell County
- John Roger Williams (born 1949), Republican U.S. representative from Texas, former Texas secretary of state, professional baseball player
- Michael L. Williams (born 1953), director of Texas Education Agency, former Texas Railroad Commissioner, former assistant secretary of education for civil rights
- Barry Williamson (born 1957), Republican former member of Texas Railroad Commission
- Arlene Wohlgemuth (born 1947), Republican member of Texas House of Representatives from Johnson County, 1995–2005; executive director of the Texas Public Policy Foundation; ran unsuccessfully against Chet Edwards for Congress in 2004
- Jared Woodfill (born 1968), Houston attorney and chairman of Harris County Republican Party, 2002–2014
- John Lee Wortham (1862–1924), Texas railroad commissioner and secretary of state, businessman
- Betsey Wright (born 1943), political lobbyist, activist, consultant
- Clymer Wright (1932–2011), political activist; father of municipal term limits in Houston
- Jim Wright (1922–2015), former congressman and speaker of the House of Representatives
- Vicente T. Ximenes (1919–2014), Mexican-American civil rights pioneer, U.S. politician
- Ralph Yarborough (1903–1996), state senator, 1957–1971; leader of progressive or liberal wing of his party
- Judith Zaffirini (born 1946), state senator from Laredo
- Bill Zedler (born 1943), member of Texas House of Representatives from Arlington
- Brian Zimmerman (1972–1996), elected mayor of Crabb at age 11

=== U.S. presidents ===
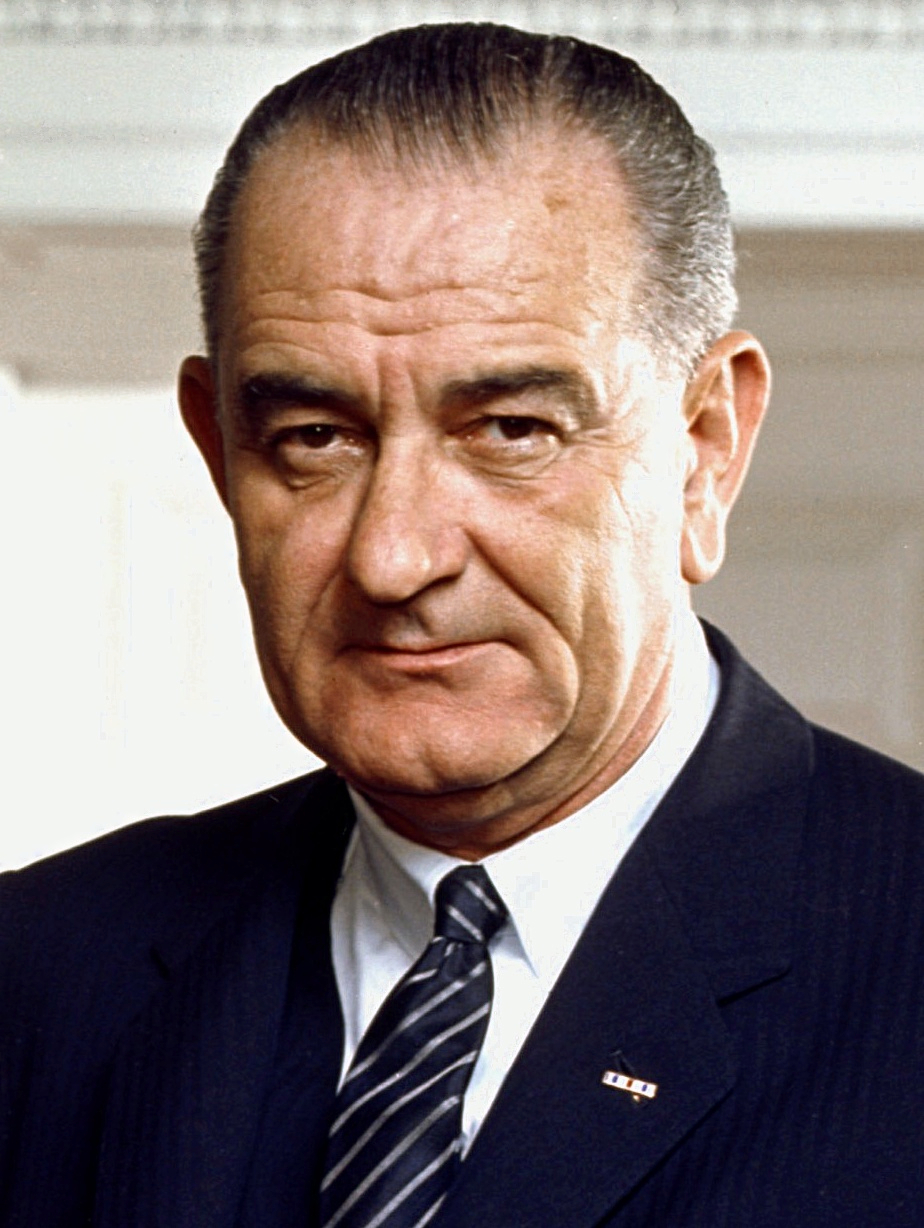
Lyndon B. Johnson

George W. Bush

- George H. W. Bush (1924–2018), 41st president and 43rd Vice President of the United States (raised in Greenwich, Connecticut, but lived much of his adult life in Texas)
- George W. Bush (born 1946), 43rd president of the United States (born in New Haven, Connecticut, but raised in Texas)
- Dwight D. Eisenhower (1890–1969), 34th president of the United States (born in Denison, Texas, but raised in Kansas)
- Lyndon B. Johnson (1908–1973), 36th president of the United States (1963–69); vice president (1961–63) (born and raised near Stonewall, Texas)

== Notable women of Texas ==
- Jessie Daniel Ames (1883–1972), suffragette, civil rights activist
- Sarah Campbell Blaffer (1885–1975), philanthropist; namesake of Blaffer Art Museum in Houston
- Annie Webb Blanton (1870–1945), suffragist, educator
- Mary Eleanor Brackenridge (1837–1924), social activist, university regent
- Mary Couts Burnett (1856–1924), philanthropist
- Laura Bush (born 1946), First Lady of the United States
- Mary Elizabeth Butt (1903–1993), philanthropist
- Minnie Fisher Cunningham (1882–1964), women's suffragist
- Nannie Webb Curtis (1861–1920), president, Texas Woman's Christian Temperance Union
- May Dickson Exall (1859–1936), civic leader, founder of Dallas Public Library
- Gloria Feldt (born 1942), feminist leader, author, political commentator
- Margaret Formby (1929–2003), founder of the National Cowgirl Museum and Hall of Fame in Fort Worth
- Mariette Rheiner Garner (1869–1948), Second Lady of the United States
- Melinda Gates (born 1964), philanthropist, wife of software magnate Bill Gates
- Edna Gladney (1886–1961), founder of "The Edna Gladney Home" for orphaned children
- Nellie Gray (1924–2012), anti-abortion activist
- Margaret Hunt Hill (1915–2007), heiress, philanthropist
- Ima Hogg (1882–1975), philanthropist
- Helen LaKelly Hunt (born 1949), philanthropist for women's causes
- Lady Bird Johnson (1912–2007), former First Lady of the United States (married to President Lyndon B. Johnson)
- Edith McAllister (1918–2018), San Antonio civic leader, philanthropist
- Maura McNiel (1921–2020), activist for women's rights
- Jane Blaffer Owen (1915–2010), arts patron, philanthropist
- Lucy Pickens (1832–1899), socialite, Southern belle; known as the "Queen of the Confederacy", her portrait appeared on some Confederate currency
- Cecile Richards (1957–2025), activist, president of Planned Parenthood
- Jennie Scott Scheuber (1860–1944), librarian, women's-suffrage activist, civic leader
- Ruth Carter Stevenson (1923–2013), arts patron, museum founder
- Mary Warburg (1908–2009), philanthropist
- Virginia Whitehill (1928–2018), activist for women's rights

== Entertainment ==
=== Dance ===
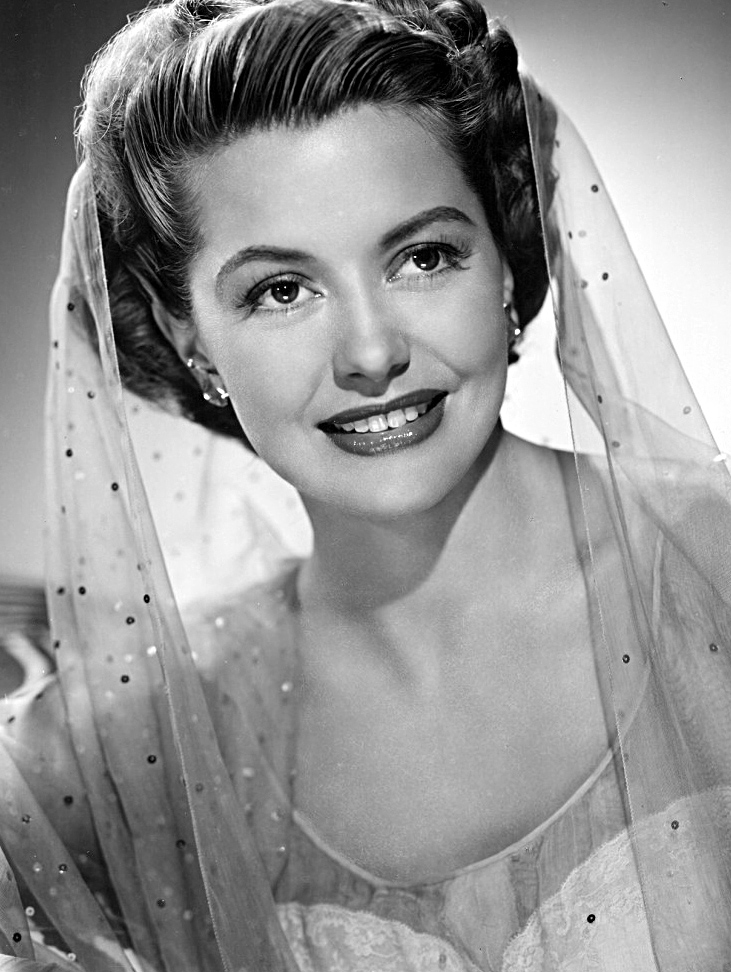
Cyd Charisse

- Joshua Allen (1989–2025), dancer, 2008 winner of So You Think You Can Dance
- Lauren Anderson (born 1965), ballet dancer; first African-American ballerina to be principal of a major company (Houston Ballet)
- Corky Ballas (born 1960), ballroom dancer
- Mark Ballas (born 1986), ballroom dancer, choreographer, actor, musician, and singer-songwriter
- Candy Barr (1935–2005), model, burlesque dancer
- Cyd Charisse (1922–2008), actress, dancer
- Bebe Daniels (1901–1971), actress, singer, dancer, writer, producer
- Gussie Nell Davis (1906–1993), physical education teacher who founded the Kilgore College Rangerettes drill team
- Kelli Finglass (born 1964), dancer, director of Dallas Cowboys Cheerleaders
- Summer Glau (born 1981), dancer and actress, Firefly
- Chachi Gonzales (born 1996), dancer
- Harrison Guy, dancer, choreographer, activist
- Nathalie Krassovska (1918–2005), ballerina, ballet teacher
- Ann Miller (1923–2004), actress, dancer
- Lisa Niemi (born 1956), dancer, choreographer, writer, actress, director
- Annette O'Toole (born 1952), dancer, actress
- Ginger Rogers (1911–1995), actress, singer, dancer
- Ross Sisters, Betsy (1926–1996), Vickie (1927–2002), and Dixie (1929–1963), Broadway singers, dancers, contortionists
- Kelly Rowland (born 1981), R&B singer-songwriter, dancer, actress
- Beyoncé (born 1981), R&B singer-songwriter, dancer, actress, producer
- George Skibine (1920–1981), ballet dancer, choreographer
- Solange (born 1986), R&B singer-songwriter, actress, model, dancer, producer, director
- Ben Stevenson (1936–2026), artistic director of Houston Ballet and Texas Ballet Theater
- Patsy Swayze (1927–2013), choreographer, dancer, dance teacher
- Judy Trammell (born 1958), choreographer for Dallas Cowboys Cheerleaders
- Texie Waterman (1931–1996), choreographer for Dallas Cowboys Cheerleaders, dancer, dance teacher

=== Fashion and modeling ===
- Lisa Baker (born 1944), Playboy Playmate of the Year
- Tyson Ballou (born 1976), model
- Candy Barr (1935–2005), model, burlesque dancer
- Brooke Burns (born 1978), model, actress
- Lois Chiles (born 1947), model, actress
- Ashley Cox (born 1956), model, actress, Playboy Playmate
- Chloe Dao (born 1972), fashion designer
- Hope Dworaczyk (born 1984), model, Playboy Playmate of the Year
- Kelly Emberg (born 1959), model, former partner of Rod Stewart
- Hannah Ferguson (born 1992), model
- Tom Ford (born 1961), former creative director for Gucci, film director
- Michelle Galdenzi (born 1987), model, actress
- Jerry Hall (born 1956), model, actress
- Marcy Hanson (born 1952), Playboy Playmate, actress
- Angie Harmon (born 1972), model, actress
- Julie Haus (born 1973), fashion designer
- Kimberly Holland (born 1982), Playboy model
- Daina House (born 1954), Playboy centerfold
- Elisa Jimenez (born 1963), fashion designer, interdisciplinary artist
- Sandy Johnson (born 1954), Playboy centerfold, actress
- Tina Knowles (born 1954), businesswoman, fashion designer
- Dorian Leigh (Parker) (1917–2008), model, considered one of the first supermodels
- Kym Malin (born 1962), Playboy Playmate, actress
- Irlene Mandrell (born 1956), model, actress
- Brandon Maxwell (born 1984), fashion designer
- Kim McLagan (1948–2006), model
- Ali Michael (born 1990), model
- Kiko Mizuhara (born 1990), model, actress, Japanese television personality
- Chandra North (born 1973), model
- Derrill Osborn (1942–2019), fashion executive
- Wendy Russell Reves (1916–2007), model, philanthropist, socialite
- Kendra Scott (born 1974), fashion designer
- Joan Severance (born 1958), model, actress
- Lori Singer (born 1957), actress, model, classical musician
- Anna Nicole Smith (1967–2007), model, actress
- Kimberly Kay Smith (born 1983), model, actress
- Amir Taghi (born 1996), fashion designer
- Tila Tequila (born 1981), model, television personality
- Paola Turbay (born 1970), model, actress, beauty pageant winner
- Ann Ward (born 1991), model, winner of America's Next Top Model, Cycle 15

=== Film, theater, and television ===
A | B | C | D–E | F–G | H | I–J | K–L | M | N–P | Q–R | S | T–U | V–Z

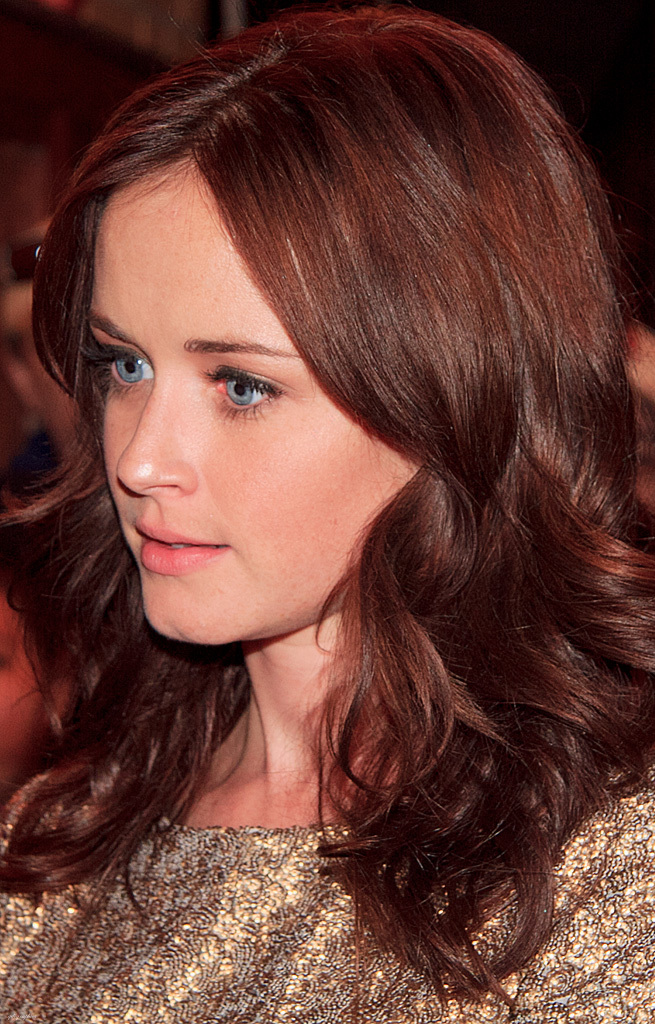
Alexis Bledel

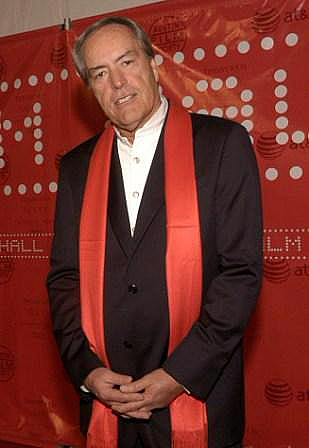
Powers Boothe

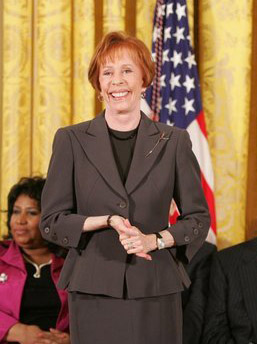
Carol Burnett

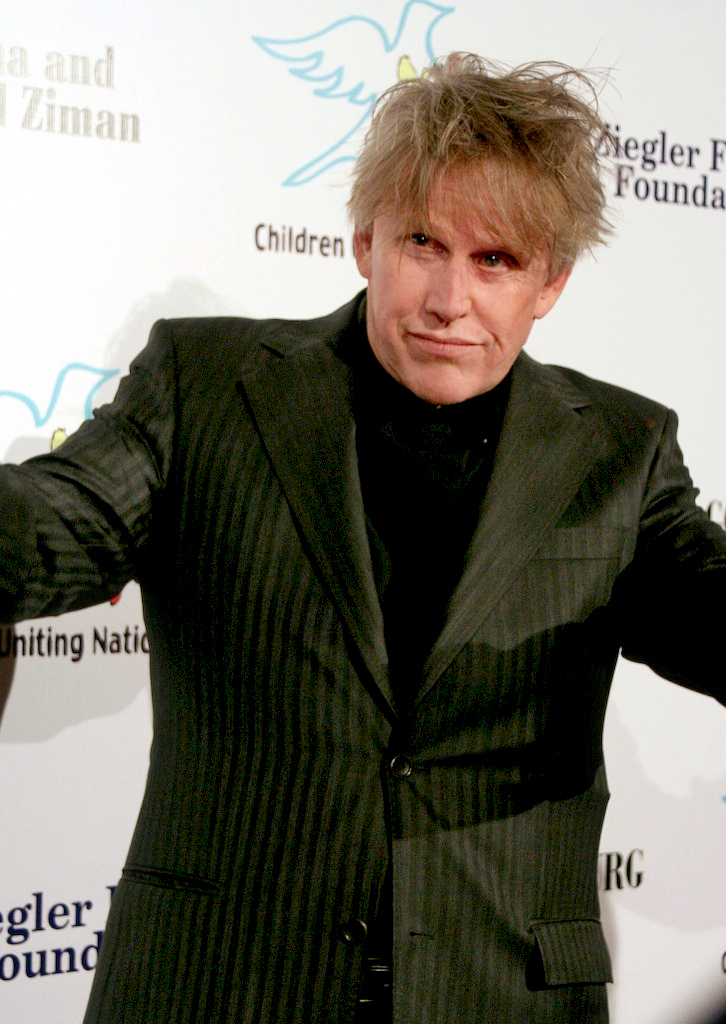
Gary Busey

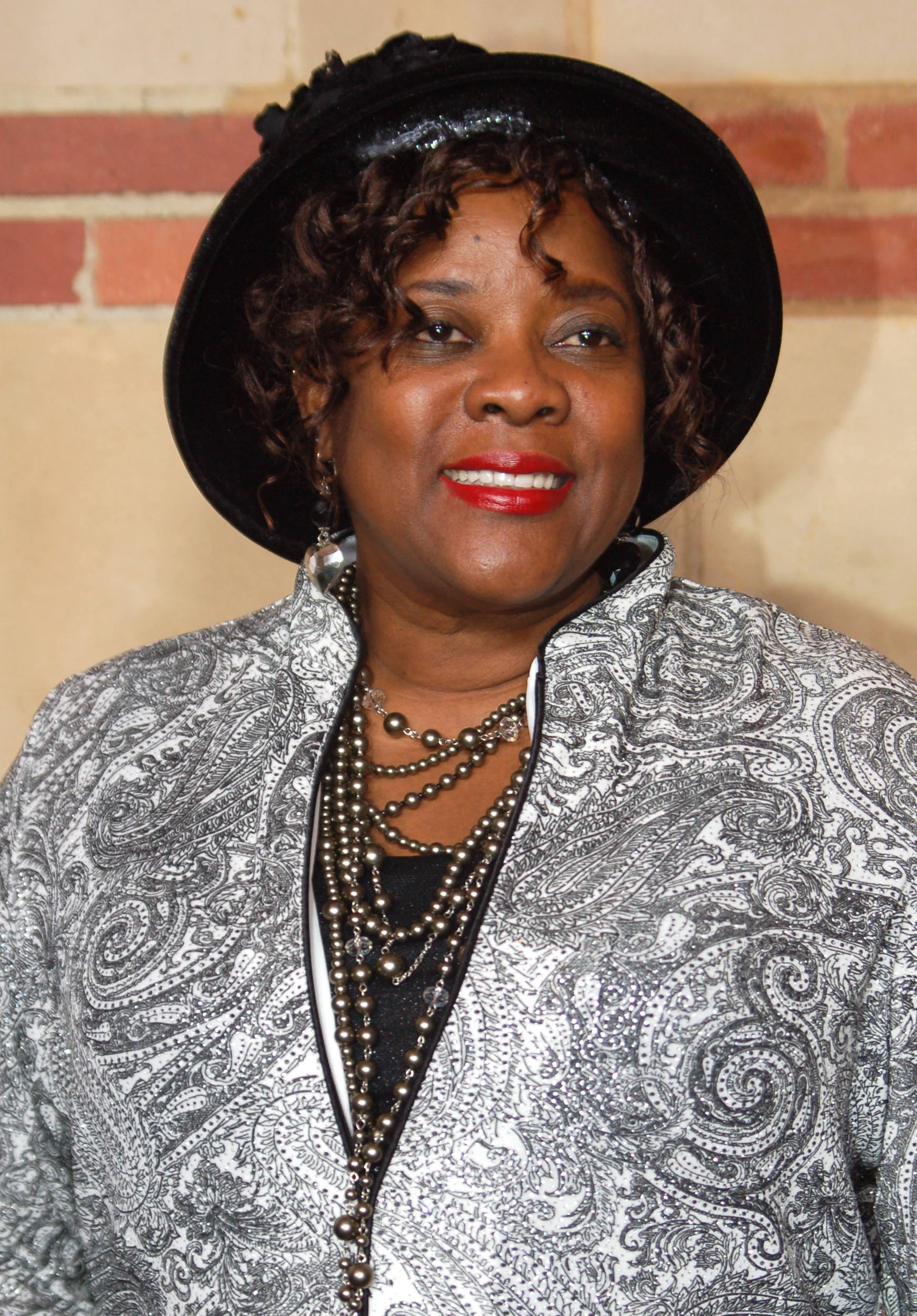
Loretta Devine

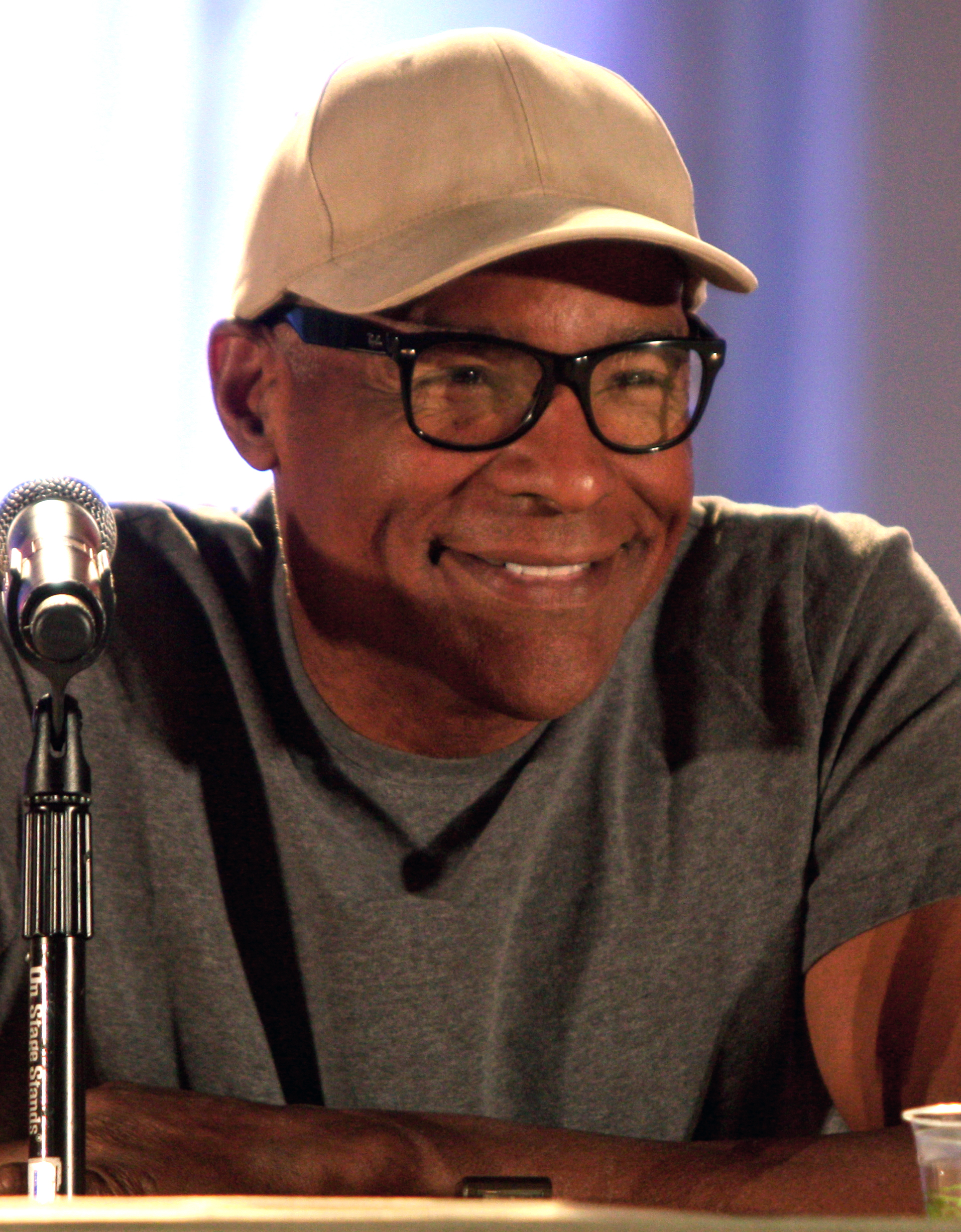
Michael Dorn

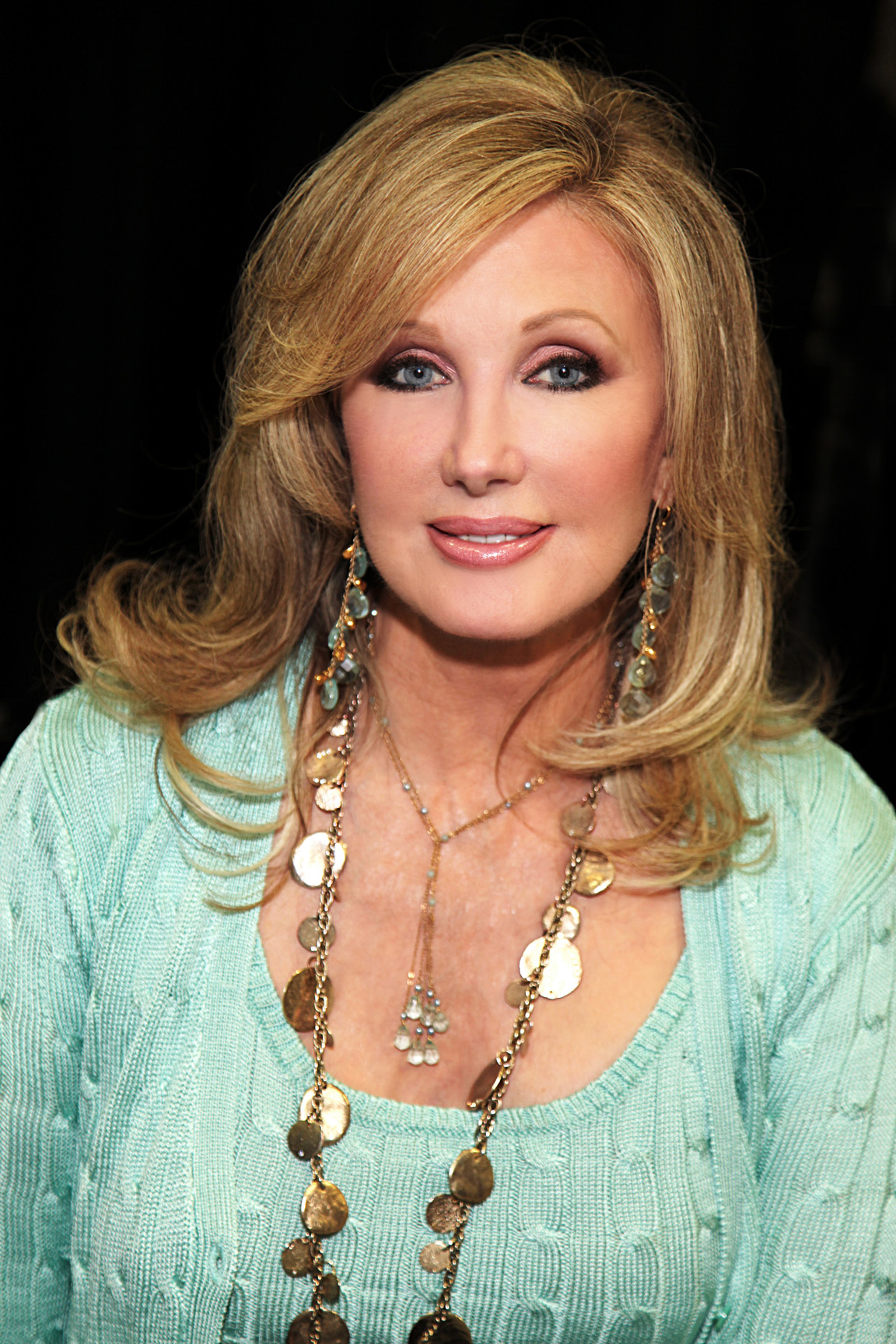
Morgan Fairchild

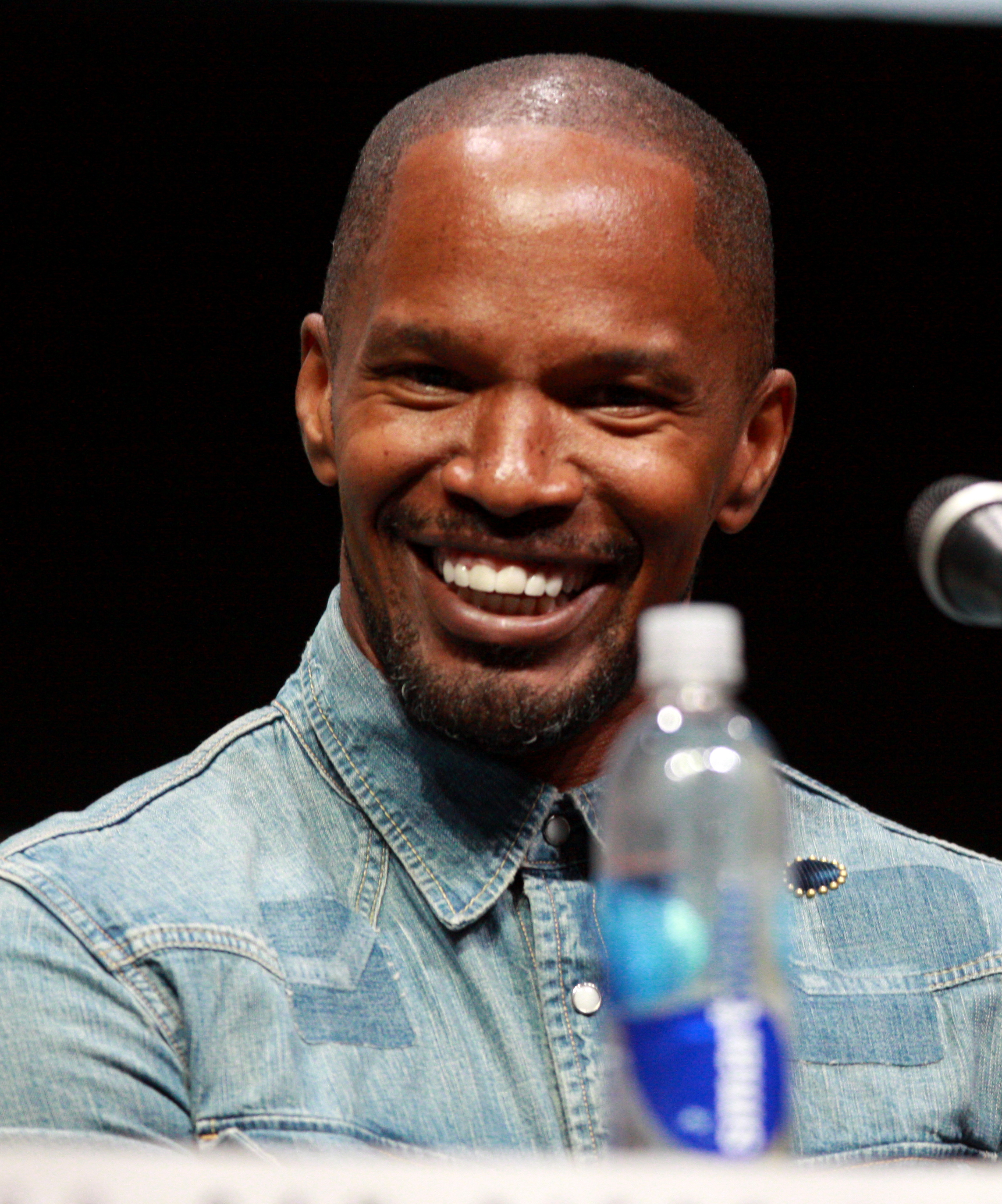
Jamie Foxx

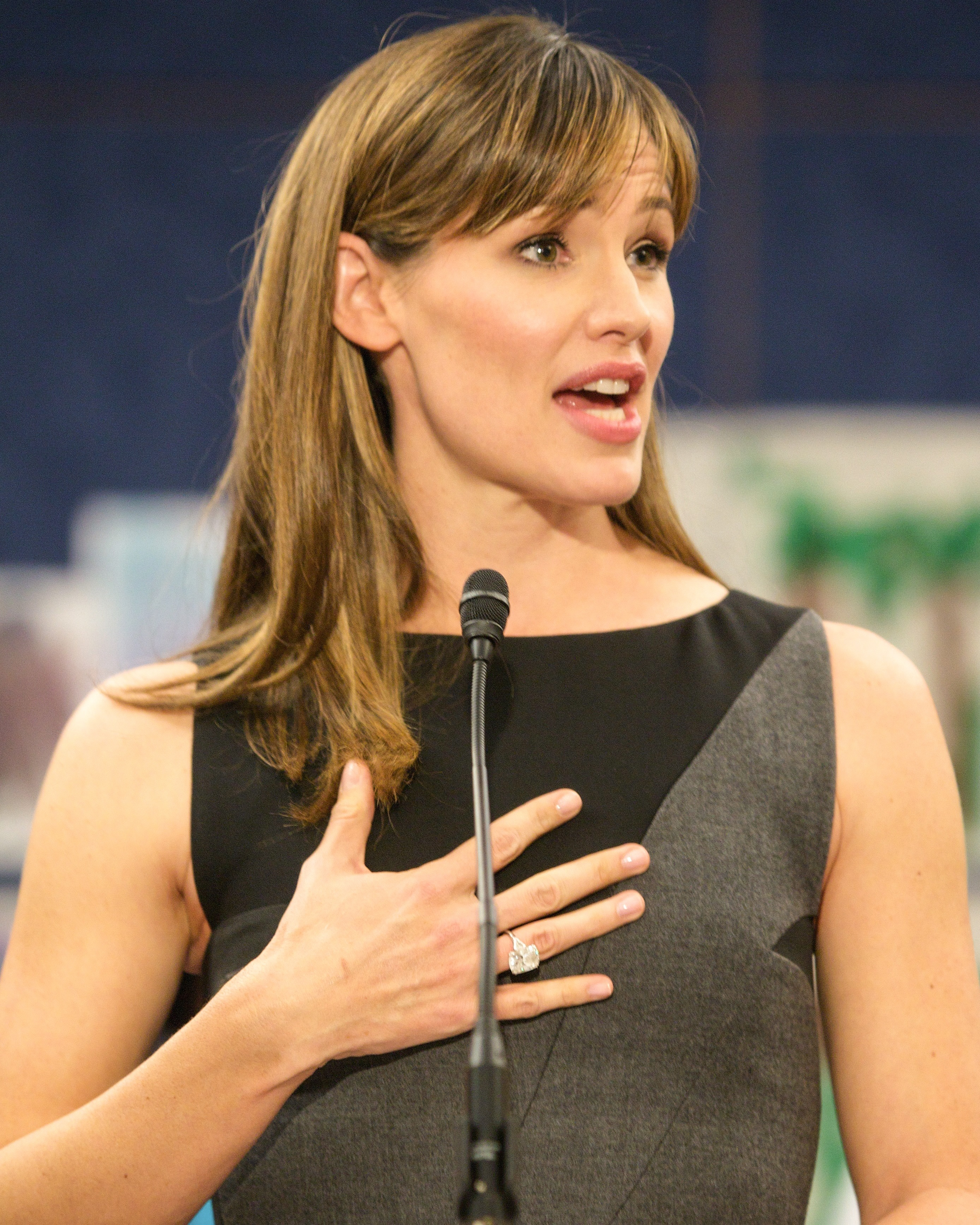
Jennifer Garner

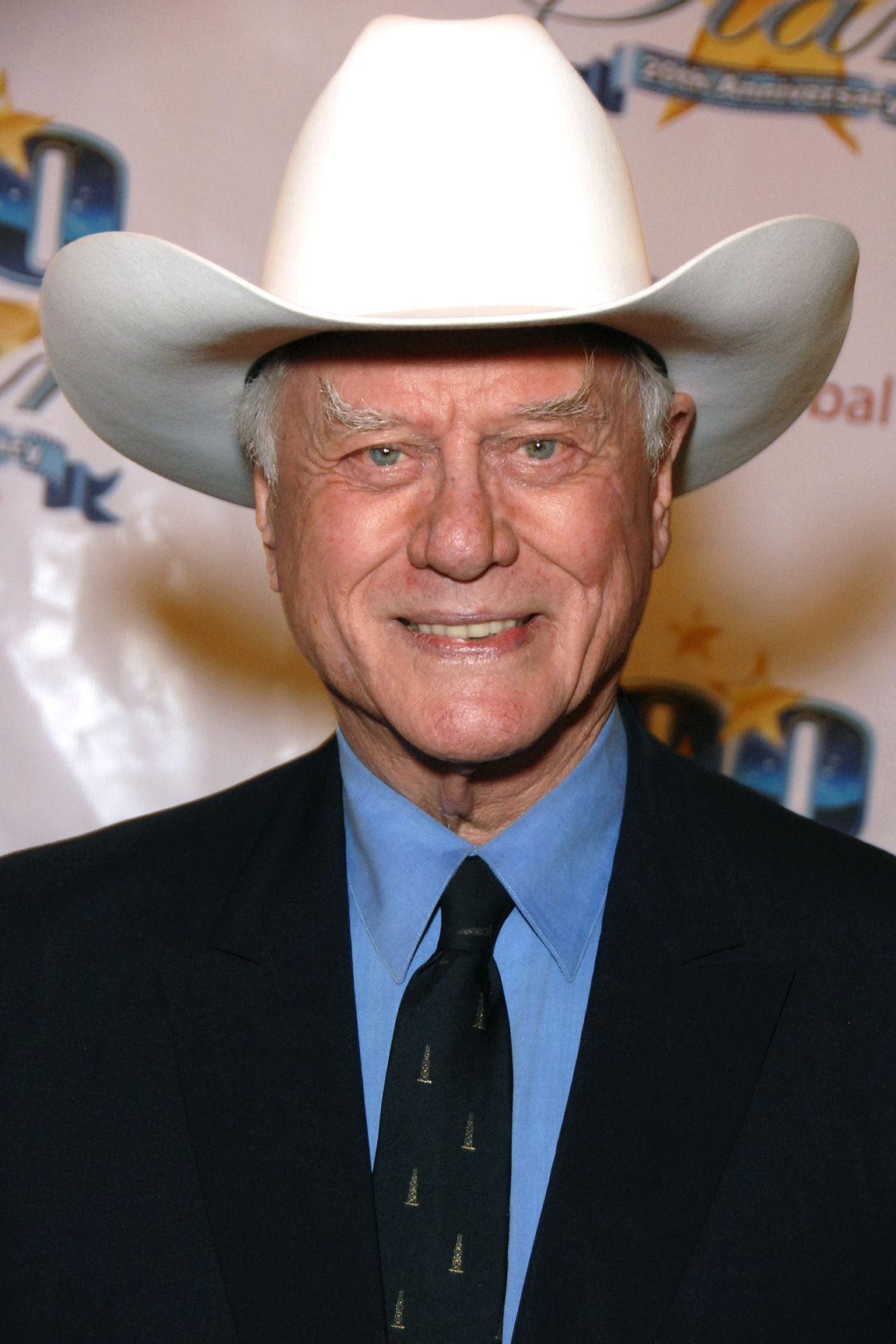
Larry Hagman

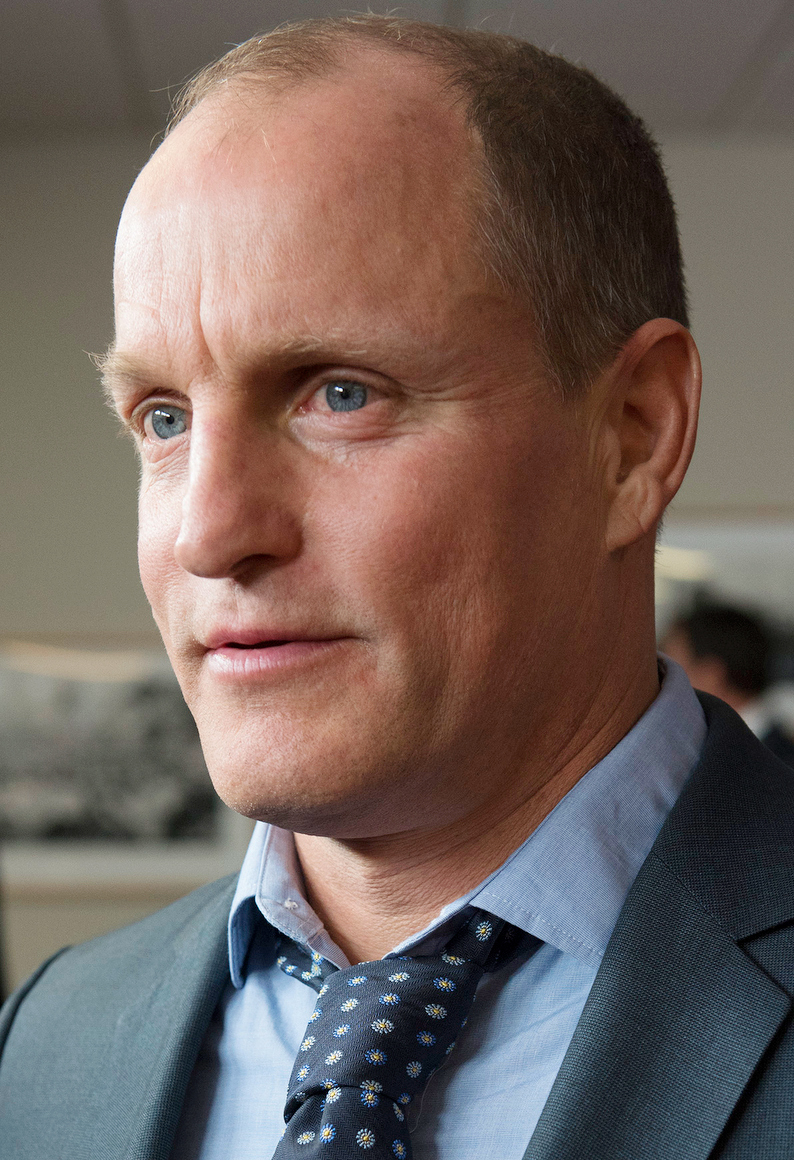
Woody Harrelson

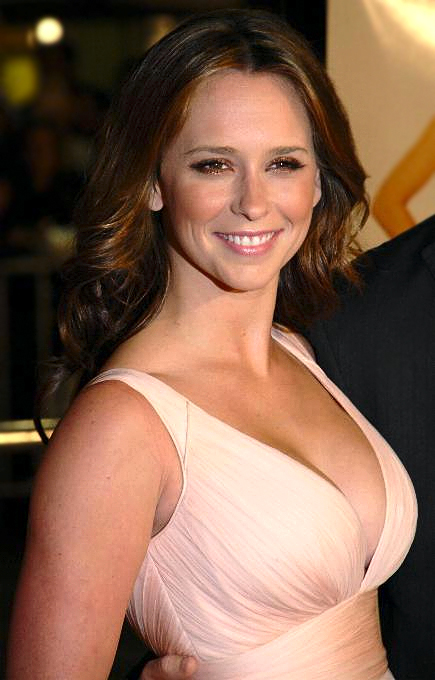
Jennifer Love Hewitt

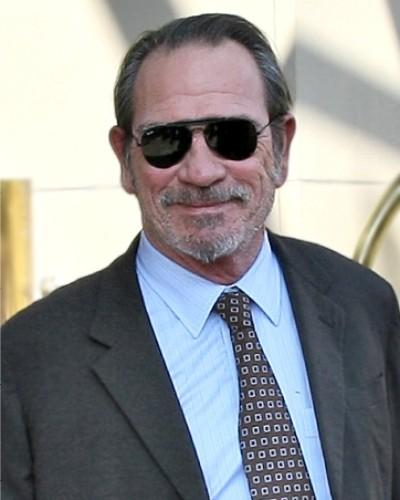
Tommy Lee Jones

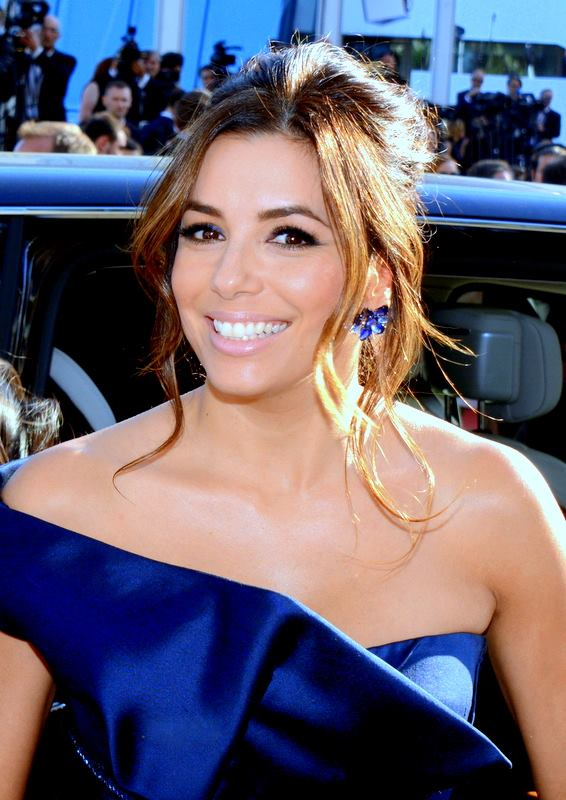
Eva Longoria

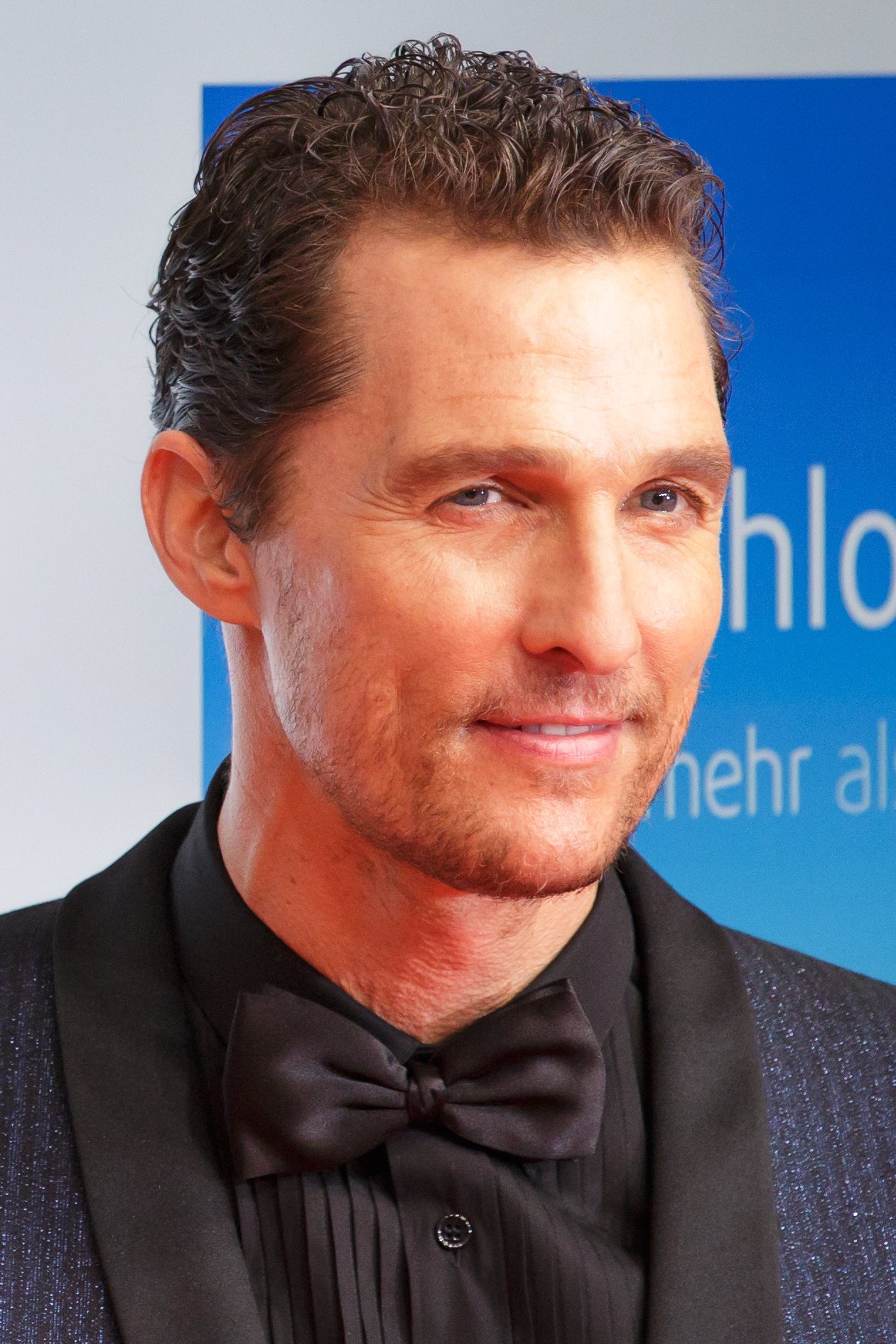
Matthew McConaughey

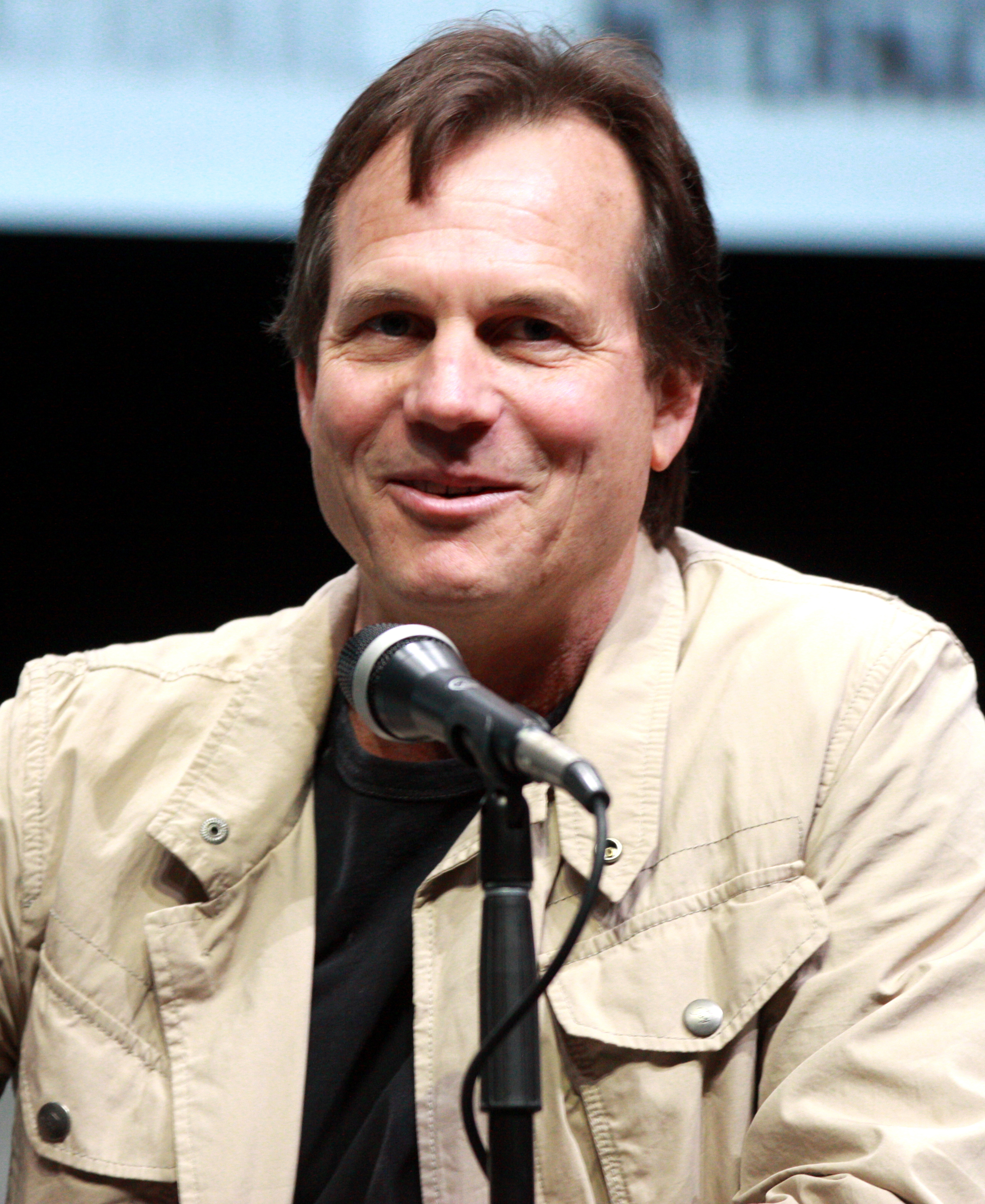
Bill Paxton

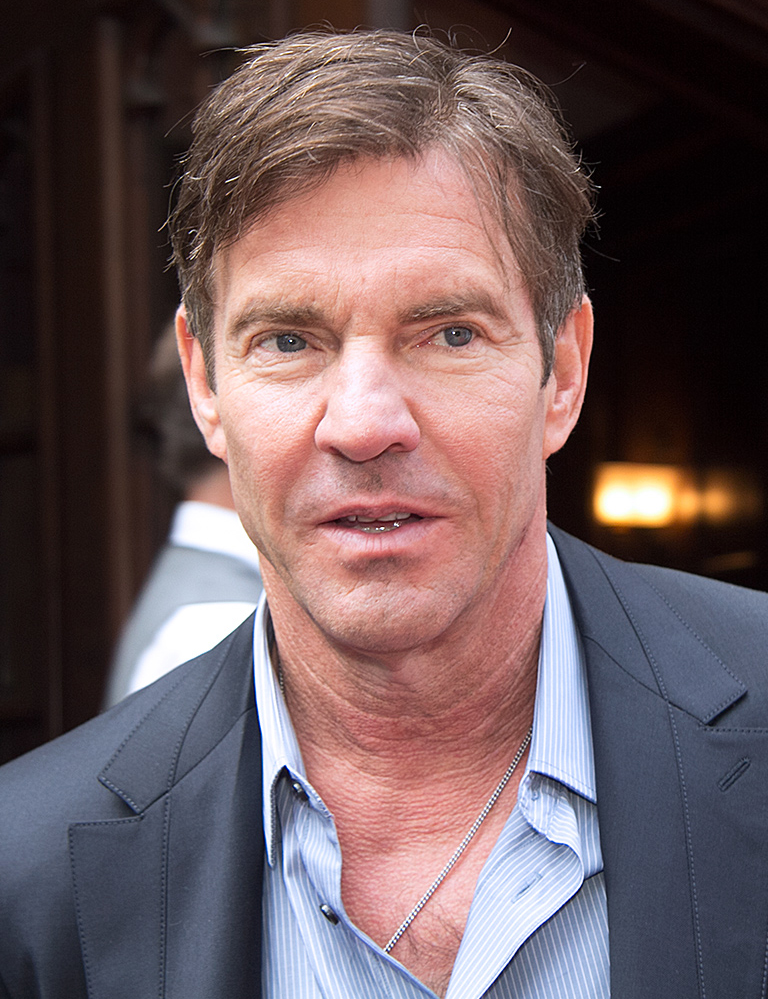
Dennis Quaid

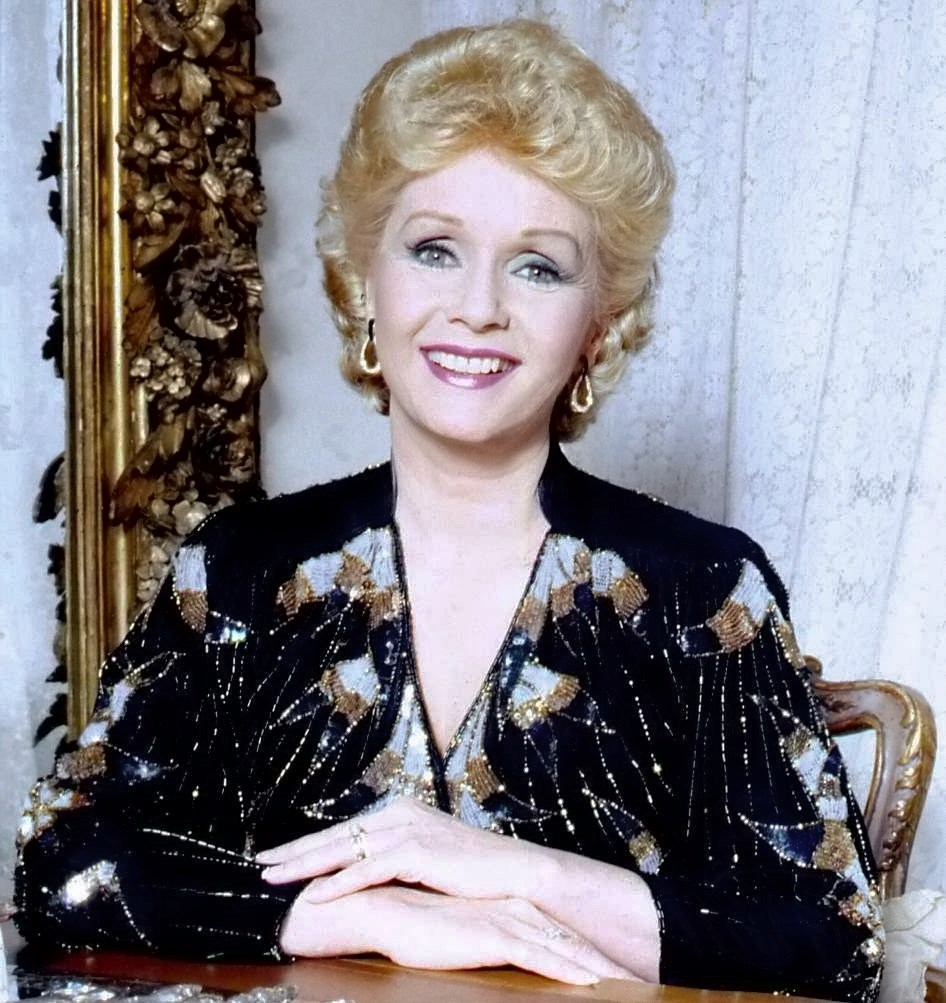
Debbie Reynolds

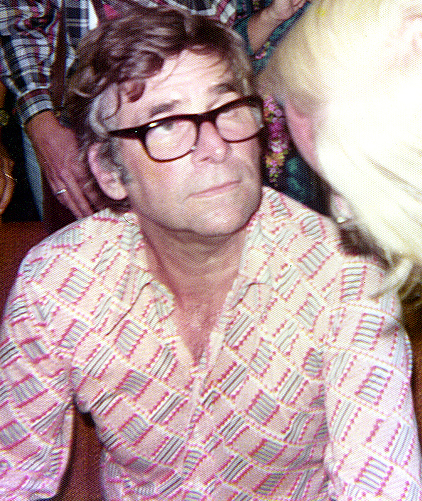
Gene Roddenberry

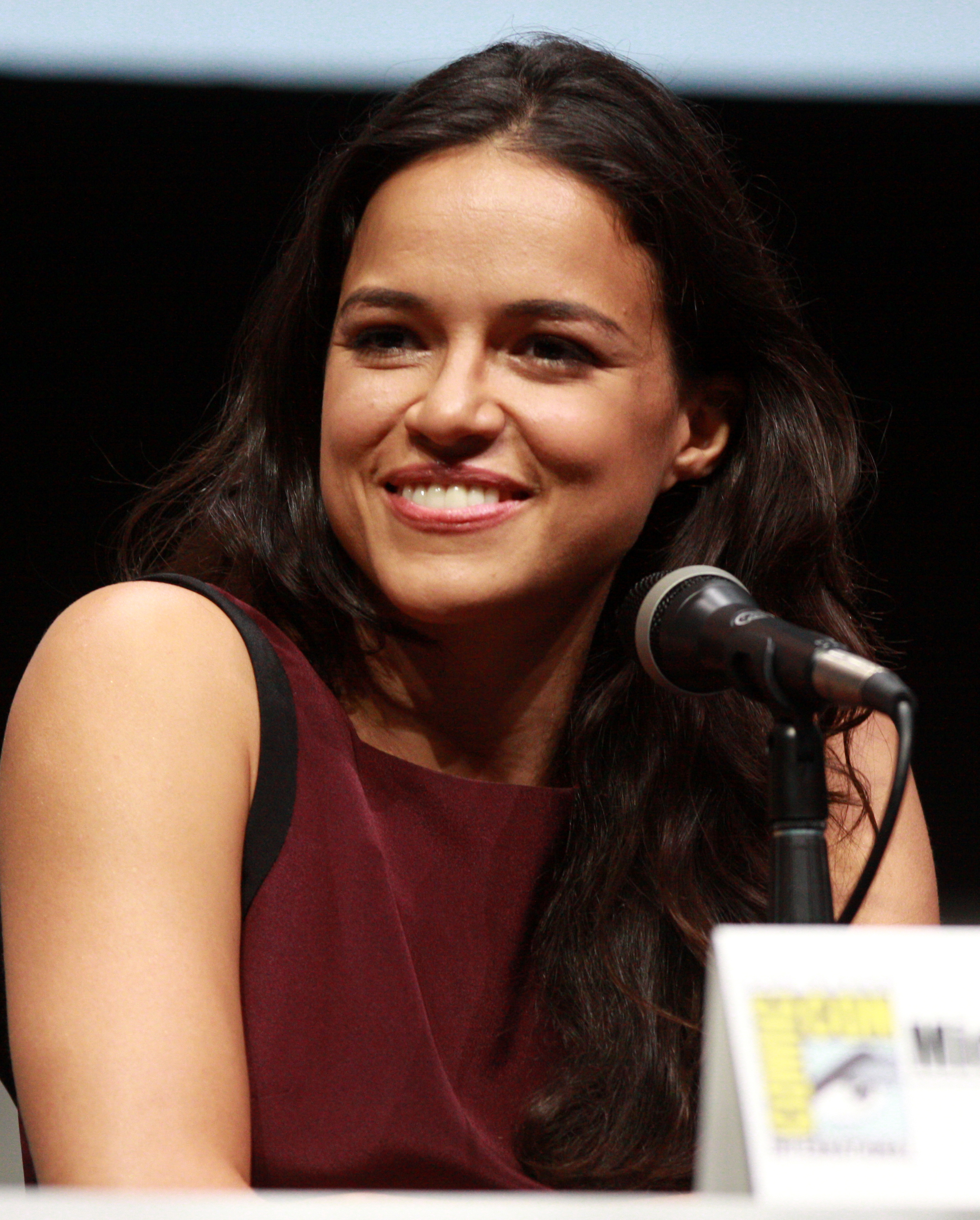
Michelle Rodriguez

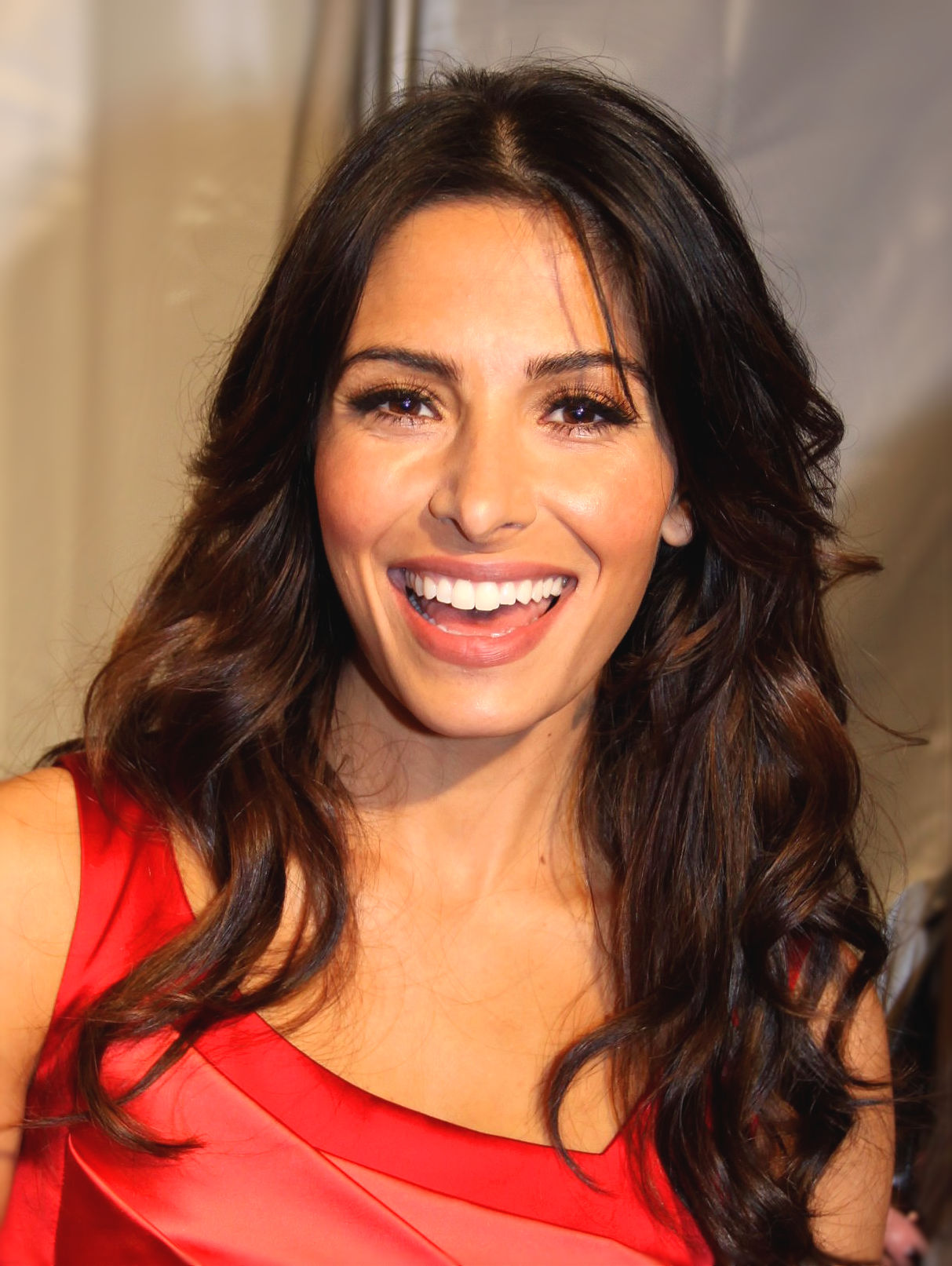
Sarah Shahi

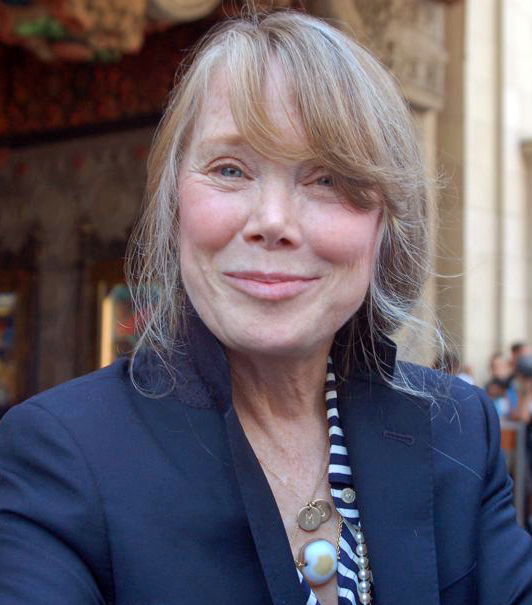
Sissy Spacek

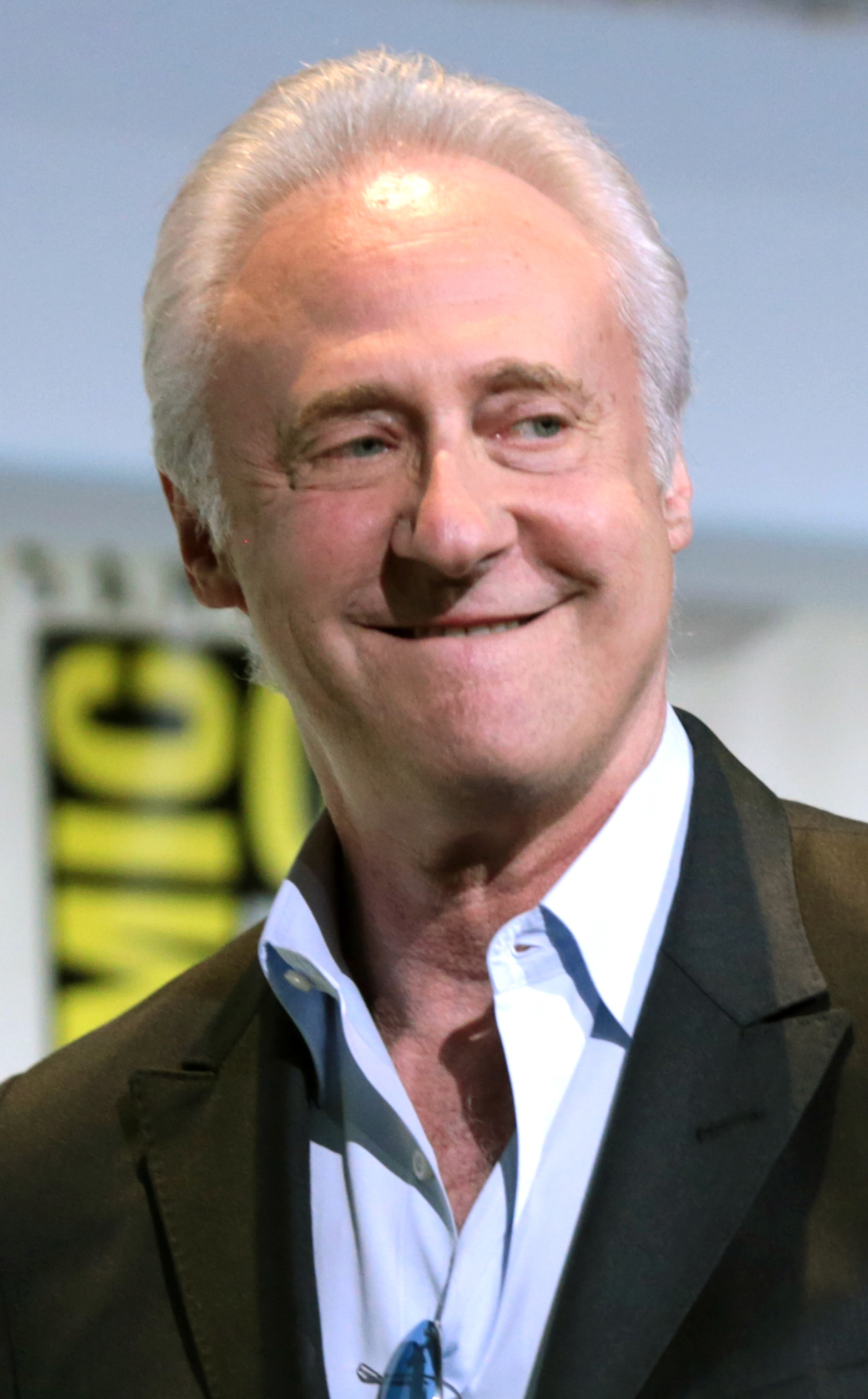
Brent Spiner

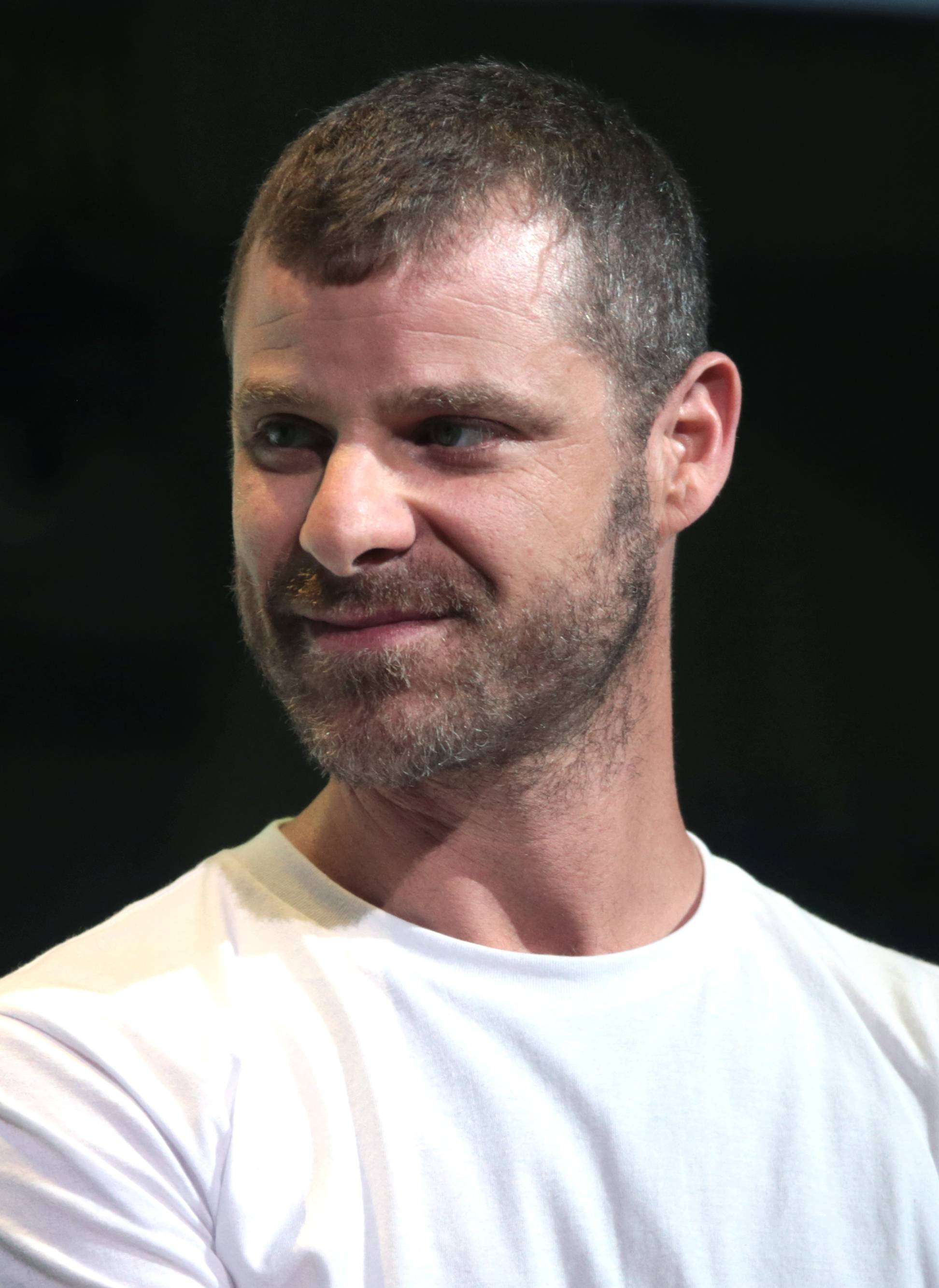
Matt Stone

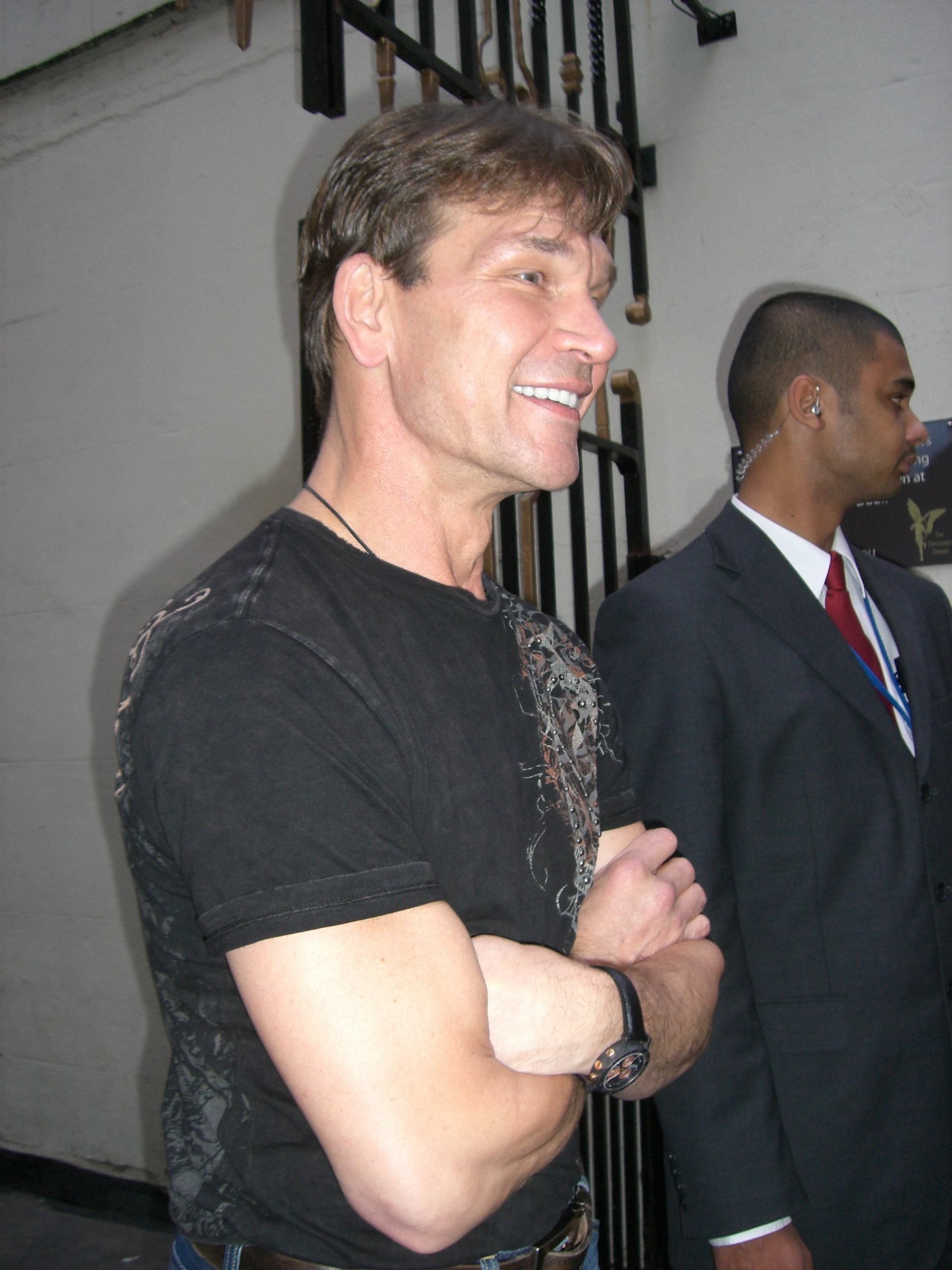
Patrick Swayze

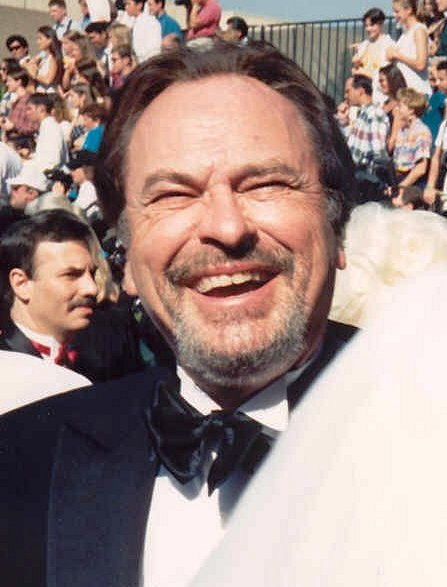
Rip Torn

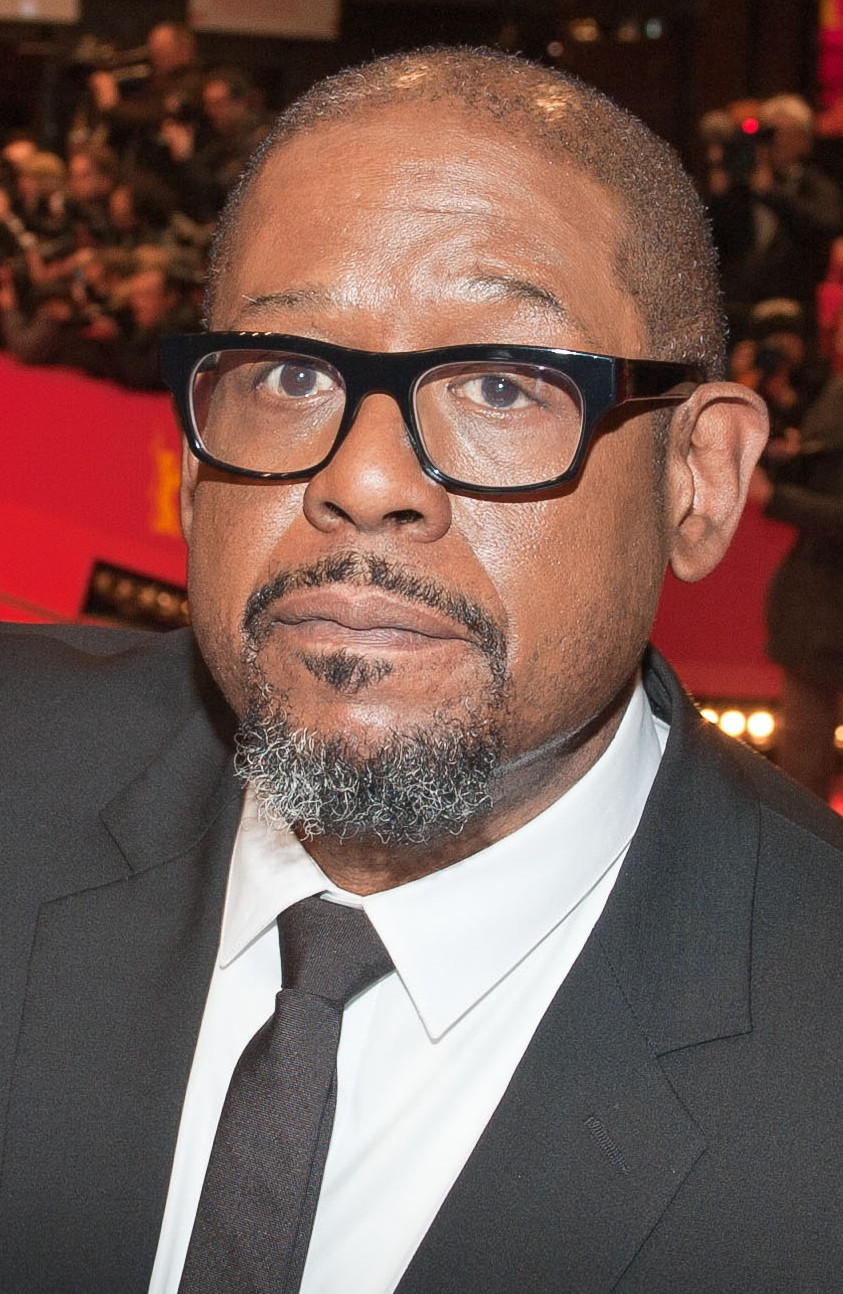
Forest Whitaker

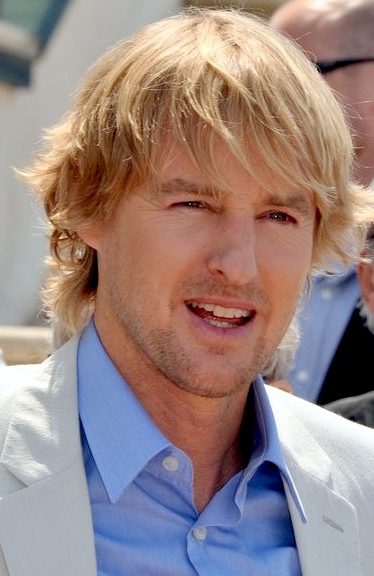
Owen Wilson

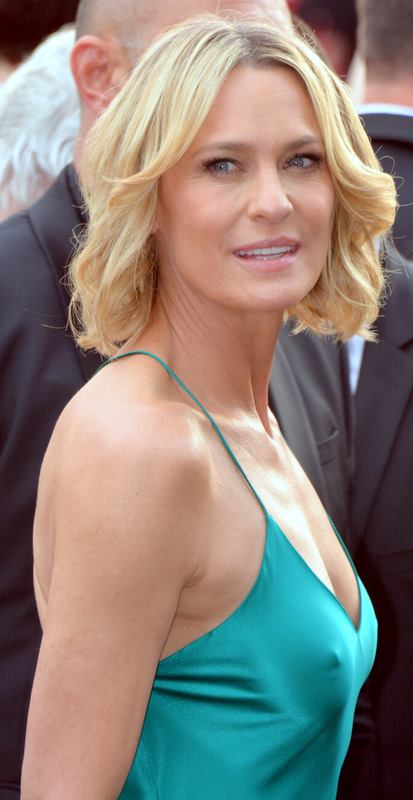
Robin Wright

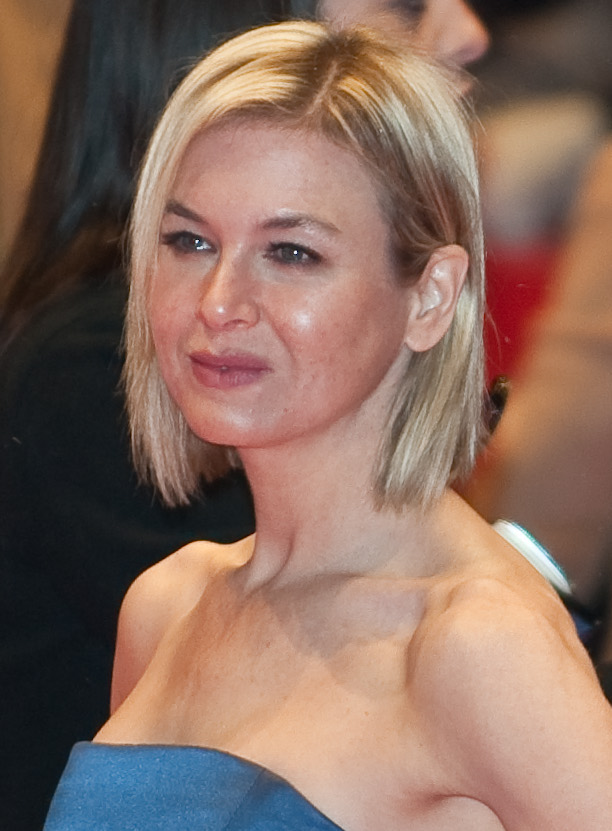
Renée Zellweger

A

- F. Murray Abraham (born 1939), Academy Award- and Golden Globe Award-winning actor
- Amy Acker (born 1976), actress, Angel
- Jensen Ackles (born 1978), actor, Smallville, Supernatural, Tracker
- Sunrise Adams (born 1982), actress
- Dianna Agron (born 1986), actress, singer
- Norman Alden (1924–2012), actor
- Kevin Alejandro (born 1976), actor
- Jaimie Alexander (born 1984), actress
- Richard Alexander (1902–1989), actor
- Debbie Allen (born 1950), actress, choreographer, director, producer
- Krista Allen (born 1971), actress
- Marshall Allman (born 1984), actor, Prison Break, True Blood
- Cristela Alonzo (born 1979), actress, comedian
- John A. Alonzo (1934–2001), cinematographer
- Audrey Marie Anderson (born 1975), actress, played Kim Brown on The Unit
- Jacqueline Anderson (born 1975), actress
- Wes Anderson (born 1969), director, Bottle Rocket, Rushmore, The Royal Tenenbaums
- Dana Andrews (1909–1992), actor, The Best Years of Our Lives, Laura
- Andrew Arbuckle (1887–1938), actor
- Macklyn Arbuckle (1866–1931), actor
- Melissa Archer (born 1979), actress
- Michael Arden (born 1982), actor
- Kelly Asbury (1960–2020), story artist, director, writer, Shrek 2
- Frank Ashmore (born 1945), actor
- Tex Avery (1908–1980), animator, cartoonist, director

B

- Lorri Bagley (born 1973), actress, model, Veronica's Closet, Ice Age
- G. W. Bailey (born 1944), actor, M*A*S*H, Police Academy
- Maddie Baillio (born 1996), actress, singer
- Pamela Baird (born 1945), actress
- Joe Don Baker (1936–2025), actor, Charley Varrick, Walking Tall
- Kathy Baker (born 1950), Emmy-winning actress, Picket Fences, Boston Public
- Troy Baker (born 1976), voice actor, musician
- Greg Baldwin (born 1960), actor, Avatar: The Last Airbender
- Taylor Ball (born 1987), actor
- Reginald Ballard (born 1965), character actor, comedian, The Bernie Mac Show, Martin
- Bob Banner (1921–2011), television producer, writer, director
- Etta Moten Barnett (1901–2004), actress, singer
- Matt Barr (born 1984), actor
- Barbara Barrie (born 1931), actress, Suddenly Susan, Barney Miller, Double Trouble
- Skye McCole Bartusiak (1992–2014), actress
- Texas Battle (born 1980), actor, played Marcus Walton on The Bold and the Beautiful
- Jim Beaver (born 1950), actor, played Ellsworth on Deadwood and played Bobby Singer on Supernatural
- David Beecroft (born 1955), actor
- Gregory Beecroft (born 1952), actor
- Madge Bellamy (1899–1990), actress
- Jeff Bennett (born 1962), voice actor, singer, Johnny Bravo
- Robby Benson (born 1956), actor, director, singer, The Legend of Prince Valiant, Ellen, Beauty and the Beast
- Robert Benton (1932–2025), Academy Award-winning screenwriter and director, Kramer vs. Kramer, Places in the Heart
- Crystal Bernard (born 1961), actress and singer, television series Wings
- Angela Bettis (born 1973), actress
- Nicole Bilderback (born 1975), actress
- Francelia Billington (1895–1934), actress in silent films
- Gil Birmingham (born 1966), actor, Billy Black in The Twilight Saga
- Dustin Lance Black (born 1979), Academy Award-winning screenwriter, director, producer
- Patricia Blair (1933–2013), actress, Daniel Boone, The Rifleman, The Electric Horseman
- Justin Blanchard (born 1980), actor
- Alexis Bledel (born 1981), actress, starred in Gilmore Girls
- Dan Blocker (1928–1972), actor, played Hoss Cartwright on Bonanza
- Joan Blondell (1906–1979), Academy Award-nominated actress
- Don Bluth (born 1937), animator, studio owner, An American Tail, The Land Before Time
- Larry Blyden (1925–1975), actor, game-show host
- Virginia True Boardman (1889–1971), silent-era film actress
- Spencer Boldman (born 1992), actor
- Jim Boles (1914–1977), actor
- John Boles (1895–1969), actor
- Tiffany Bolton (born 1971), actress, model, talk-show host
- Matthew Bomer (born 1977), actor, Tru Calling, White Collar
- Kevin Booth (born 1961), film director, producer, lecturer, musician
- Powers Boothe (1948–2017), actor, Deadwood, Tombstone, Southern Comfort
- Jesse Borrego (born 1962), actor, Fame, 24, Dexter
- Michael Bowen (born 1953), actor, Jackie Brown, Magnolia, Lost
- Rob Bowman (born 1960), film and television director, The X-Files, Star Trek: The Next Generation
- Lombardo Boyar (born 1973), actor, The Bernie Mac Show
- Richard Bradford (1934–2016), actor, Man in a Suitcase, The Untouchables
- David Bradley (born 1953), actor, American Samurai
- Abby Brammell (born 1979), actress, played Tiffy Gerhardt on The Unit
- Larry Brantley (born 1966), voice actor, comedian, radio spokesman
- Eve Brent (1929–2011), actress
- Mary Brian (1906–2002), actress
- James Brown (1920–1992), actor, The Adventures of Rin Tin Tin
- Tammie Brown (born 1980), actor, drag queen, musician
- Larry Buchanan (1923–2004), film director, producer, writer
- Samantha Buck (born 1974), actress, Law & Order: Criminal Intent
- Betty Buckley (born 1947), film and Tony Award-winning stage actress, singer
- Norman Buckley (born 1955), television director and editor
- Dennis Burkley (1945–2013), actor
- Carol Burnett (born 1933), actress, comedian, The Carol Burnett Show
- Demi Burnett (born 1995), reality-television personality
- Brooke Burns (born 1978), actress, model
- Burnie Burns (born 1973), writer, actor, producer, comedian, host, director
- Marilyn Burns (1949–2014), actress, starred in The Texas Chain Saw Massacre (1974)
- Wendell Burton (1947–2017), actor, The Sterile Cuckoo
- Gary Busey (born 1944), Academy Award-nominated actor, The Buddy Holly Story, Under Siege
- Tom Byron (born 1961), adult film actor, director, producer

C

- Kevin Cahoon (born 1971), actor, director, singer-songwriter
- Bill Camfield (1929–1991), radio and television host, writer, comedian
- Kate Capshaw (born 1953), actress, married to Steven Spielberg
- Gina Carano (born 1982), actress, television personality, mixed martial arts fighter
- Steve Cardenas (born 1974), martial artist and retired actor, Mighty Morphin Power Rangers, Power Rangers: Zeo
- Edwin Carewe (1883–1940), film director, actor, producer, writer
- Thomas Carter (born 1953), director, actor
- Allen Case (1934–1986), actor, singer
- John L. Cason (1918–1961), actor
- Don Castle (1917–1966), actor
- Darlene Cates (1947–2017), actress
- JC Caylen (born 1992), YouTuber, actor, singer, comedian
- Derek Cecil (born 1973), actor, House of Cards
- Miguel Cervantes (born 1977), actor
- Duane Lee Chapman, II (born 1973), Dog the Bounty Hunter
- Leland Chapman (born 1976), Dog the Bounty Hunter
- Cyd Charisse (1922–2008), actress, dancer, Singin' in the Rain, The Band Wagon
- Paulina Chávez (born 2002), actress
- Ricardo Chavira (born 1971), actor, played Carlos Soli on Desperate Housewives
- Lois Chiles (born 1947), actress, model, Moonraker, The Great Gatsby, Broadcast News
- Thomas Haden Church (born 1961), Academy Award-nominated actor, Sideways, Spider-Man 3, All About Steve
- Victoria Clark (born 1959), Tony Award-winning actress, singer
- Katie Rose Clarke (born 1984), theater actress
- Jack Clay (1926–2019), acting teacher, actor, director
- Taylor Cole (born 1984), actress/model, Summerland, The Event
- Dabney Coleman (1932–2024), actor, Buffalo Bill, 9 to 5, The Towering Inferno, Tootsie
- Jessica Collins (born 1983), actress, played Maggie on Rubicon
- Lynn Collins (born 1979), actress, X-Men Origins: Wolverine
- Marcus Collins (born 1974), actor, singer
- Shanna Collins (born 1983), actress, Swingtown
- Ellar Coltrane (born 1994), actor
- Chris Cooper (born 1951), actor; winner, Academy Award for Best Supporting Actor, Adaptation, Seabiscuit, The Bourne Identity, The Patriot, The Muppets
- Tamarie Cooper (born 1970), actress, playwright
- Barry Corbin (born 1940), actor, Urban Cowboy, Nothing in Common, Who's Harry Crumb?
- Alex Cord (1933–2021), actor, Airwolf, rancher
- Allen Coulter (born 1969), film and television director, The Sopranos
- Ashley Cox (born 1956), actress, model
- David Crabb (born 1975), actor
- Yvonne Craig (1937–2015), actress
- Norma Crane (1928–1973), actress, Fiddler on the Roof
- Chace Crawford (born 1985), actor, Gossip Girl
- Joan Crawford (1908–1977), Academy Award-winning actress, Mildred Pierce, Johnny Guitar, What Ever Happened to Baby Jane?
- Catherine Crier (born 1954), television personality, judge
- Kathryn Crosby (1933–2024), actress, Anatomy of a Murder, wife of Bing Crosby
- Shauna Cross (born 1974), screenwriter, author, roller derby athlete
- Brett Cullen (born 1956), actor, The Young Riders, Legacy, Ghost Rider
- Erin Cummings (born 1977), actress, Detroit 1-8-7
- Bonnie Curtis (born 1966), film producer

D–E

- Tony Dalton (born 1975), actor, played Lalo Salamanca on Better Call Saul
- Diana Danielle (born 1991), Malaysian actress, born in Houston
- Bebe Daniels (1901–1971), actress, singer, dancer, writer, producer
- Linda Darnell (1923–1965), actress, Forever Amber, A Letter to Three Wives
- Jim Dauterive (born 1957), producer and writer, King of the Hill
- Kennedy Davenport (Reuben Asberry Jr.) (born 1982), television personality, drag queen, dancer
- Madison Davenport (born 1996), actress
- Phyllis Davis (1940–2013), actress
- Eddie Dean (1907–1999), singer-songwriter, actor
- Jimmy Dean (1923–2010), country-western impresario, actor (Diamonds Are Forever), entrepreneur
- Lezlie Deane (born 1964), actress, singer
- Marjorie Deanne (1917–1994), actress, first winner of Miss Texas pageant
- Alana de la Garza (born 1976), actress, Law & Order, CSI: Miami, The Mountain, FBI
- Madison De La Garza (born 2001), teen actress, Desperate Housewives
- Bob Denver (1935–2005), actor, played Maynard G. Krebs in Dobie Gillis and title role in Gilligan's Island
- Elizabeth De Razzo (born 1980), actress, played Maria on Eastbound & Down
- Kaitlyn Dever (born 1996), teen actress, Last Man Standing, Justified
- Loretta Devine (born 1949), actress, Waiting to Exhale, Grey's Anatomy
- Dorothy Devore (1899–1976), actress, comedian
- Jenna Dewan (born 1980), actress, star of Step Up, Take the Lead and The Rookie
- Elliott Dexter (1870–1941), actor
- Shae D'lyn (born 1962), actress, Dharma and Greg
- Frank Q. Dobbs (1939–2006), screenwriter, director, producer
- Chris Donahue (born 1958), Academy Award-winning film producer
- Colby Donaldson (born 1974), actor
- Michael Dorn (born 1952), star of Star Trek: The Next Generation and Star Trek: Deep Space Nine
- Jessica Drake (born 1974), porn star
- Haylie Duff (born 1985), actress
- Hilary Duff (born 1987), actress, singer, Lizzie McGuire, Younger
- Todd Duffey (born 1974), actor
- Karen Dufilho-Rosen (born 1968), Academy Award-winning film producer
- Josh Duhon (born 1982), actor, played Logan Hayes on General Hospital
- Donnie Dunagan (1934–2026), actor, voice actor
- Sandy Duncan (born 1946), actress, singer, The Sandy Duncan Show, The Hogan Family
- Kenton Duty (born 1995), teen actor, Shake It Up, Ctrl
- Shelley Duvall (1949–2024), actress, The Shining, Annie Hall, Olive Oyl in film Popeye
- George Eads (born 1967), actor, plays Nick Stokes in television series CSI
- Greg Edmonson, music composer for television, movies and video games, King of the Hill, Firefly
- Edward Edwards, actor
- Ike Eisenmann (born 1962), actor, producer
- Shannon Elizabeth (born 1973), actress, American Pie
- Chris Elley (born 1977), film director, writer, producer
- Chris Ellis (born 1956), actor
- Ron Ely (1938–2024), actor, Tarzan
- Mireille Enos (born 1975), actress
- Molly Erdman (born 1974), actress
- Bill Erwin (1914–2010), character actor
- Dale Evans (1912–2001), actress, singer-songwriter, married to Roy Rogers
- Shahine Ezell, actor

F–G

- Morgan Fairchild (born 1950), actress in Dallas television series (one of three actresses to play character "Jenna Wade") and Flamingo Road
- Parisa Fakhri (born 1975), voice actress, Dragon Ball GT, Fruits Basket
- Amy Farrington (born 1966), actress
- Farrah Fawcett (1947–2009), actress and artist, Charlie's Angels, The Burning Bed, Extremities, The Apostle
- Katie Featherston (born 1982), actress, Paranormal Activity
- Jay R. Ferguson (born 1974), actor, The Conners
- Rosita Fernández (1919–2006), actress, pop singer
- Tyra Ferrell (born 1962), actress, The Cape, City, The Bronx Zoo
- Margaret Field (1922–2011), actress, mother of actress Sally Field
- Miles Fisher (born 1983), actor
- Sean Patrick Flanery (born 1965), actor, The Boondock Saints
- Horton Foote (1916–2009), two-time Academy Award-winning screenwriter
- Michelle Forbes (born 1965), actress, Homicide: Life on the Street, 24, True Blood, Star Trek: The Next Generation
- Tom Forman (1893–1926), actor, writer, producer
- Steve Forrest (1925–2013), actor, So Big, Mommie Dearest, North Dallas Forty
- Robert Foxworth (born 1941), actor, Falcon Crest, Six Feet Under
- Jamie Foxx (born 1967), Academy Award-winning actor, The Jamie Foxx Show, Ray, Any Given Sunday, Django Unchained
- James Frawley (1936–2019), director, actor, producer
- Gavin Free (born 1988), video cinematographer
- Al Freeman Jr. (1934–2012), actor, director, Finian's Rainbow, Malcolm X
- K. Todd Freeman (born 1965), actor
- Augustine Frizzell (born 1979), actress, director, screenwriter
- Robert Fuller (born 1933), actor, rancher
- Chris Furrh (born 1974), actor
- Jennifer Garner (born 1972), actress, 13 Going on 30, Dallas Buyers Club, Draft Day, television series Alias
- Joy Garrett (1945–1993), actress, singer
- Greer Garson (1904–1996), Academy Award-winning actress
- Nancy Gates (1926–2019), actress
- Lynda Day George (born 1944), actress, television series Mission: Impossible
- Jody Gilbert (1916–1979), actress
- Gracie Gillam (born 1992), actress, singer, dancer
- Richard Gilliland (1950–2021), actor
- Marc Gilpin (1966–2023), actor; Jaws 2, Legend of the Lone Ranger
- Peri Gilpin (born 1961), actress, Frasier
- Michael Gladis (born 1977), actor, Mad Men, Eagleheart
- Lesli Linka Glatter (born 1953), film director; president of Directors Guild of America
- Summer Glau (born 1981), dancer and actress, Firefly
- Carlin Glynn (1940–2023), actress, singer
- Dale Godboldo (born 1975), actor
- Renée Elise Goldsberry (born 1971), actress, singer-songwriter
- Mike Gomez (born 1951), actor
- Selena Gomez (born 1992), actress and singer, formed band Selena Gomez & The Scene
- Nicholas Gonzalez (born 1976), actor
- Pedro Gonzalez-Gonzalez (1925–2006), character actor
- Jill Goodacre (born 1965), actress, model
- YaYa Gosselin (born 2009), actress
- Mckenna Grace (born 2006), actress
- Brea Grant (born 1981), actress, played Daphne Millbrook on Heroes
- Teresa Graves (1948–2002), actress
- David Gordon Green (born 1975), filmmaker
- John Gremillion (born 1967), voice actor
- Nan Grey (1918–1993), actress
- Corinne Griffith (1894–1979), actress
- Kristin Griffith (born 1953), actress
- Texas Guinan (1884–1933), actress, singer, entrepreneur
- Tim Guinee (born 1962), actor
- Froy Gutierrez (born 1998), actor
- Anne Gwynne (1918–2003), actress

H

- Tommy Habeeb (born 1958), actor, writer, producer
- Sara Haden (1899–1981), actress
- Reed Hadley (1911–1974), actor, Racket Squad
- Sarah Hagan (born 1984), actress
- Emily Hagins (born 1992), film producer, writer, editor, director
- Larry Hagman (1931–2012), actor, I Dream of Jeannie, Dallas, son of actress Mary Martin
- Monte Hale (1919–2009), actor, country singer
- Jackie Earle Haley (born 1961), Academy Award-nominated actor, The Bad News Bears, Breaking Away, Little Children
- Bug Hall (born 1985), actor
- Irma P. Hall (1935–2026), actress
- James Hall (1900–1940), actor
- Jerry Hall (born 1956), model, actress, former wife of Mick Jagger
- Hope Hampton (1897–1982), actress in silent films
- John Lee Hancock (born 1956), film director, The Blind Side
- Gunnar Hansen (1947–2015), actor, The Texas Chain Saw Massacre
- Marcy Hanson (born 1952), actress, Playboy model
- Jerry Hardin (born 1929), actor
- Melora Hardin (born 1967), actress
- Ty Hardin (1930–2017), actor
- Ann Harding (1903–1981), actress
- Catherine Hardwicke (born 1955), film director, Twilight
- Mark Harelik (born 1951), actor, playwright
- Estelle Harman (1922–1995), acting coach
- Angie Harmon (born 1972), actress, Law & Order, Rizzoli & Isles
- William Jackson Harper (born 1980), actor
- James N. Harrell (1918–2000), actor
- Woody Harrelson (born 1961), actor, Cheers, Natural Born Killers, White Men Can't Jump, No Country for Old Men, True Detective
- Laura Harring (born 1964), actress, Mulholland Drive
- Fran Harris (born 1965), television host, life coach, professional basketball player
- Harriet Sansom Harris (born 1955), actress, Desperate Housewives, Frasier, It's All Relative, The 5 Mrs. Buchanans
- Chris Harrison (born 1971), television announcer
- James V. Hart (born 1960), screenwriter
- Lisa Hartman-Black (born 1956), actress, Knots Landing
- Ethan Hawke (born 1970), actor, Training Day, Before Midnight, Dead Poets Society
- John Hawkes (born 1959), Academy Award-nominated actor, Winter's Bone, Deadwood, The Sessions
- Brad Hawkins (born 1976), actor, VR Troopers
- Jerry Haynes (1927–2011), actor, children's television host
- Ted Healy (1896–1937), vaudeville performer, comedian, actor; created The Three Stooges
- Amber Heard (born 1986), actress, Friday Night Lights, Pineapple Express, Drive Angry
- Rick Hearst (born 1965), actor
- Katherine Helmond (1929–2019), actress, Soap
- Sherman Hemsley (1938–2012), actor, The Jeffersons, adopted El Paso as his hometown
- Josh Henderson (born 1981), actor, model, singer, Dallas, Desperate Housewives, Over There
- Logan Henderson (born 1989), actor and singer
- Tiffany Hendra (born 1971), actress, television personality
- Kim Henkel (born 1946), screenwriter, director, producer, actor
- Bill "Tex" Henson (1924–2002), animator
- Stephen Herek (born 1958), film director, 101 Dalmatians
- Jennifer Love Hewitt (born 1979), actress, Ghost Whisperer, The Client List, 9-1-1
- Tamara Hext (born 1963), actress, winner of Miss Texas pageant
- Joel Heyman (born 1971), actor
- John Benjamin Hickey (born 1963), actor, It's All Relative, The Big C
- Jeff Hiller (born c. 1975), actor, comedian
- John Hillerman (1932–2017), actor, played English Major domo Higgins on Magnum, P.I.
- Jordan Hinson (born 1991), actress
- Junie Hoang (born 1971), actress and plaintiff in Hoang v. Amazon.com
- Gregory Hoblit (born 1944), television and film director
- Tommy Hollis (1954–2001), actor
- Charlene Holt (1928–1996), actress
- Tobe Hooper (1943–2017), director The Texas Chain Saw Massacre, Poltergeist, Salem's Lot
- William Hootkins (1948–2005), actor, Batman, Raiders of the Lost Ark, Star Wars
- Roger Horchow (1928–2020), Broadway producer, catalog entrepreneur
- Lee Horsley (born 1955), actor, Matt Houston
- Larry Hovis (1936–2003), actor, Hogan's Heroes
- Susan Howard (born 1944), born in Marshall, longtime actress in Dallas television series
- Matt Hullum (born 1974), director, producer, writer, actor, visual effects supervisor
- Gayle Hunnicutt (1943–2023), actress, Marlowe, The Legend of Hell House
- Paige Hurd (born 1992), actress, Everybody Hates Chris
- Tracy Hutson (born 1986), reality television personality
- Martha Hyer (1924–2014), Academy Award-nominated actress, Some Came Running, The Carpetbaggers, The Sons of Katie Elder

I–J

- Cristina Ibarra, documentary filmmaker
- Judith Ivey (born 1951), film and Tony Award-winning stage actress, director
- John M. Jackson (born 1950), actor, played Rear Admiral A. J. Chegwidden on JAG
- Gary Jacobs (born 1952), television comedy writer, producer, author
- Dorothy Janis (1912–2010), actress in silent films
- Annalee Jefferies (born 1954), actress
- Rita Jenrette (born 1949), actress, television journalist, real-estate executive, model, princess
- Chane't Johnson (1976–2010), actress
- Dakota Johnson (born 1989), actress
- Janelle Johnson (1923–1995), actress; mother of The Monkees' Micky Dolenz
- Sandy Johnson (born 1954), actress, model
- Joe Johnston (born 1950), film director, Jumanji, Jurassic Park III, Captain America: The First Avenger
- Terra Jolé (born 1980), reality TV personality
- Nick Jonas (born 1992), singer, actor
- Alex Jones (born 1974), radio host, television host, film producer
- Angus T. Jones (born 1993), actor, Jake Harper on Two and a Half Men
- Ashley Jones (born 1976), actress, The Bold and the Beautiful, The Young and the Restless
- Caleb Landry Jones (born 1989), actor
- Carolyn Jones (1929–1983), actress, played Morticia Addams on The Addams Family
- Dick Jones (1927–2014), actor, starring role of Buffalo Bill, Jr. and voice of Pinocchio
- L. Q. Jones (1927–2022), actor, The Wild Bunch, Casino, originally from Beaumont
- Margo Jones (1911–1955), theatre founder and director
- Mickey Jones (1941–2018), actor, musician, Home Improvement, Flo
- Preston Jones (1936–1979), playwright, actor, director
- Preston Jones (born 1983), actor
- Sam J. Jones (born 1954), actor, Flash Gordon, The Highwayman
- Tommy Lee Jones (born 1946), Academy Award-winning actor, The Fugitive, Men in Black, Batman Forever, No Country for Old Men, Lincoln
- Glenn Jordan (born 1936), television director, producer
- Montana Jordan (born 2003), actor
- Jonathan Joss (1965–2025), actor, star of King of the Hill
- Mike Judge (born 1962), producer, animator and actor, star of Beavis & Butthead and King of the Hill

K–L

- Joseph Kahn (born 1972), music video, advertising, and feature film director
- Christian Kane (born 1974), actor, singer, played "Lindsay" on Angel, Close to Home, Leverage, The Librarians
- Jon Keeyes (born 1969), film director, producer, screenwriter
- Allison Keith (born 1974), actor, voice actor
- Evelyn Keyes (1916–2008), actress, Gone With the Wind
- Callie Khouri (born 1957), Academy Award-winning screenwriter, director
- Guy Kibbee (1882–1956), actor
- Candice King (born 1987), actress best known as Caroline Forbes on The Vampire Diaries
- Charles King (1895–1957), actor
- Liza Koshy (born 1996), actress, internet personality
- Bernard L. Kowalski (1929–2007), film and television director
- Kris Kristofferson (1936–2024), singer-actor, Blade
- Berry Kroeger (1912–1991), actor
- Greg Kwedar, film director, screenwriter
- Eric Ladin (born 1978), actor, The Killing
- Christine Lakin (born 1979), actress, Step by Step, Valentine's Day
- Paul Lambert (1922–1997), actor
- Sasha Lane (born 1995), actress
- Wallace Langham (born 1965), actor, CSI: Crime Scene Investigation, The Larry Sanders Show, Veronica's Closet
- Brooke Langton (born 1970), actress
- Louise Latham (1922–2018), actress
- Jody Lawrance (1930–1986), actress
- Sheryl Leach (born 1952), creator of children's programming (Barney & Friends)
- Katie Leclerc (born 1986), actress
- Ruta Lee (born 1936), actress
- Cherami Leigh (born 1988), actress
- Brad Leland (born 1954), actor, Friday Night Lights
- Joshua Leonard (born 1975), actor, writer, director
- Hal LeSueur (1901?–1963), actor; brother of Joan Crawford
- Liana Liberato (born 1995), actress
- Lar Park Lincoln (1961–2025), actress
- Amy Lindsay (born 1966), actress
- Rachel Lindsay (born 1985), reality television star, The Bachelorette
- Richard Lineback (born 1952), actor
- Richard Linklater (born 1961), director Slacker, Dazed and Confused, Before Sunrise, School of Rock, A Scanner Darkly
- Cody Linley (born 1989), actor, rapper, singer
- Lucien Littlefield (1895–1960), actor in silent films
- Tembi Locke (born 1970), actress, Eureka, Sliders
- Jacqueline Logan (1901–1983), actress in silent films
- Joshua Logan (1908–1988), stage and film director
- Eva Longoria (born 1975), actress, Desperate Housewives
- Trini Lopez (1937–2020), singer and actor, The Dirty Dozen
- Demi Lovato (born 1992), singer, actress
- Bessie Love (1898–1986), actress
- Deirdre Lovejoy (born 1962), actress, Rhonda Pearlman on The Wire
- Todd Lowe (born 1977), actor
- David Lowery (born 1980), film director
- Shannon Lucio (born 1980), actress
- Allen Ludden (1917–1981), emcee, game show host
- Baruch Lumet (1898–1992), theatre actor, director, teacher

M

- Donald MacDonald (1898–1959), actor
- Lydia Mackay (born 1977), voice actress
- Peter MacNicol (born 1954), Emmy Award-winning actor, Ally McBeal, Chicago Hope, Numb3rs, Sophie's Choice
- Meredith MacRae (1944–2000), actress, Petticoat Junction
- Martha Madison (born 1977), actress
- Valerie Mahaffey (1953–2025), actress
- Terrence Malick (born 1943), director Badlands, Days of Heaven, The Thin Red Line
- Kym Malin (born 1962), actress, model
- Irlene Mandrell (born 1956), actress, model
- David Mann (born 1966), actor, singer
- Tamela Mann (born 1966), actress, singer
- Stephanie March (born 1974), actress, Law & Order: Special Victims Unit
- Amelia Marshall (born 1958), actress
- Mary Martin (1913–1990), Emmy Award- and Tony Award-winning actress, mother of actor Larry Hagman
- Steve Martin (born 1945), actor, The Jerk, Pennies from Heaven, Three Amigos, Planes, Trains and Automobiles, Father of the Bride, Parenthood, The Pink Panther
- Margo Martindale (born 1951), actress, The Riches, 100 Centre Street, The Millers
- Peter Masterson (1934–2018), actor, director, producer, writer
- Kimberly Matula (born 1988), actress
- Nava Mau (born 1992), actress
- Brad Maule (born 1951), actor
- Adam Mayfield (born 1976), actor
- Peter Mayhew (1944–2019), actor
- Tim McCanlies (born 1963), screenwriter, director
- Cameron McCasland (born 1981), filmmaker
- Mart McChesney (1954–1999), actor
- Matthew McConaughey (born 1969), Academy Award-winning actor, Dallas Buyers Club, A Time to Kill, The Lincoln Lawyer, Contact, Magic Mike, True Detective
- Carolyn McCormick (born 1959), actress, played Dr. Liz Olivet on Law & Order
- Jake McDorman (born 1986), actor, Greek, Limitless
- Spanky McFarland (1928–1993), actor, played "Spanky" in the Our Gang comedies, aka The Little Rascals
- Bruce McGill (born 1950), actor, Animal House, The Legend of Bagger Vance, 61*, Lincoln
- Jay McGraw (born 1979), television producer and executive producer, author
- Kevin McHale (born 1988), actor
- Ben McKenzie (born 1978), actor, The O.C., Southland and Gotham
- Alex McLeod (born 1968), actress
- Scoot McNairy (born 1977), actor, producer, Halt and Catch Fire, 12 Years a Slave, Argo
- Terrence McNally (1939–2020), playwright
- William McNamara (born 1965), actor
- Leighton Meester (born 1986), actress, Gossip Girl
- Windell Middlebrooks (1979–2015), actor
- Liz Mikel (born 1963), actress, singer
- Ann Miller (1923–2004), actress, dancer
- Austin Miller (born 1976), actor, dancer, singer
- Billy Miller (1979–2023), actor, The Young and the Restless, All My Children
- Carl Miller (1893–1979), actor
- Logan Miller (born 1992), actor, musician
- McKaley Miller (born 1996), actress, Hart of Dixie, Partners
- Valarie Rae Miller (born 1974), actress
- Don Mischer (1940–2025), television producer, director
- Elizabeth Mitchell (born 1970), actress, Lost, V, ER
- Tom Mix (1880–1940), silent film actor
- Roger Mobley (born 1949), child actor, Christian pastor
- DeQuina Moore (born 1986), actress
- Belita Moreno (born 1949), actress, George Lopez
- Jo Morrow (born 1939), actress
- Glenn Morshower (born 1959), actor, Agent Aaron Pierce on 24
- Michael Muhney (born 1975), actor
- Mitchel Musso (born 1991), actor, singer, musician
- Megan Mylan (born 1969), Academy Award-winning documentary filmmaker

N–P

- Jack Nance (1943–1996), actor
- Nancy Nash (1897–?), actress
- Edwin Neal (born 1945), actor
- Ted Neeley (born 1943), singer-actor, Jesus Christ Superstar
- Tracey Needham (born 1967), actress, Life Goes On, JAG, The Division
- Pola Negri (1897–1987), silent film actress
- Austin Nichols (born 1980), actor, Julian Baker on One Tree Hill
- Lisa Niemi (born 1956), actress, director, dancer, choreographer, writer
- Derek Lee Nixon (born 1983), actor
- James Noble (1922–2016), actor, Benson
- Timothy Nolen (1941–2023), Broadway actor/singer, opera singer
- Chuck Norris (1940–2026), actor, Walker, Texas Ranger
- Renee O'Connor (born 1971), actress
- John Baker "Texas Jack" Omohundro (1846–1880), actor, cowboy, frontier scout
- Ty O'Neal (born 1978), actor
- Lupe Ontiveros (1942–2012), actress
- Hayley Orrantia (born 1994), singer, actress, The Goldbergs
- Peter Ostrum (born 1957), veterinarian, former child actor, Willy Wonka & the Chocolate Factory
- Annette O'Toole (born 1955), actress, Superman III, Smallville
- Dan Hewitt Owens (born 1947), actor
- Lee Pace (born 1979), actor
- Jared Padalecki (born 1982), actor, Gilmore Girls, Supernatural, Walker
- Kevin Page (born 1959), actor, artist
- Greg Pak (born 1968), film director, comic-book writer
- Kay Panabaker (born 1990), television actress
- Fess Parker (1924–2010), actor, Daniel Boone, Mr. Smith Goes to Washington, Old Yeller
- Kathryn O'Rourke Parker (born 1948), television producer
- Suzy Parker (1932–2003), actress, model
- Hunter Parrish (born 1987), actor, Weeds
- Jim Parsons (born 1973), Emmy Award-winning actor, The Big Bang Theory
- Paul A. Partain (1946–2005), actor
- Tayla Parx (born 1993), actress
- Pedro Pascal (born 1975), actor
- Eric Patrick, filmmaker, animator, educator
- Edi Patterson, actress
- Hank Patterson (1888–1975), actor
- Bill Paxton (1955–2017), actor and director, Titanic, Apollo 13, Twister, Big Love
- Mark Payne (born 1965), make-up artist, filmmaker, author
- Evelyn Peirce (1908–1960), actress
- Eagle Pennell (1952–2002), film director
- Channing Godfrey Peoples (born 1977), writer, director, producer
- Jack Pepper (1902–1979), vaudeville dancer, singer, comedian, actor, nightclub manager; first husband of Ginger Rogers
- Piper Perabo (born 1976), actress, Covert Affairs, The Prestige, Looper, Coyote Ugly
- Marco Perella (born 1949), actor
- Valerie Perrine (born 1943), Academy Award-nominated actress, Lenny, The Electric Horseman, Superman
- Lou Perryman (1941–2009), actor
- Madison Pettis (born 1998), actress
- Cindy Pickett (born 1947), actress, St. Elsewhere, Ferris Bueller's Day Off
- Arthur C. Pierce (1923–1987), screenwriter, film director
- Mary Kay Place (born 1947), actress, Mary Hartman, Mary Hartman, The Big Chill, John Grisham's The Rainmaker
- Jesse Plemons (born 1988), actor
- Matthew Posey (1958–2026), actor, director
- Esteban Powell (born 1976), actor
- Glen Powell (born 1988), actor, Top Gun: Maverick, Twisters
- Joan Prather (born 1950), actress
- Ann Prentiss (1939–2010), actress
- Paula Prentiss (born 1938), actress, What's New Pussycat?, Where the Boys Are, Catch-22, The Stepford Wives
- Missi Pyle (born 1972), actress, singer, Charlie and the Chocolate Factory, DodgeBall

Q–R

- Dennis Quaid (born 1954), actor, Breaking Away, The Right Stuff, The Big Easy, Wyatt Earp, Everybody's All-American, Any Given Sunday
- Randy Quaid (born 1950), actor, The Last Picture Show, The Last Detail, National Lampoon's Vacation, Brokeback Mountain
- Molly Quinn (born 1993), actress, We're the Millers, Castle, Winx Club
- Kevin Rahm (born 1971), actor, Judging Amy, Desperate Housewives, Mad Men, Jesse
- Steve Railsback (born 1945), actor, Helter Skelter, The Stunt Man
- Ron Raines (born 1949), actor, singer
- Dominic Rains (born 1982), actor
- Ethan Rains (born 1981), actor
- Sendhil Ramamurthy (born 1974), actor, Mohinder Suresh on Heroes
- Haley Ramm (born 1992), actress
- Ben Rappaport (born 1986), actor, Outsourced
- Phylicia Rashād (born 1948), actress, The Cosby Show
- Jackson Rathbone (born 1984), actor, musician
- Richard Rawlings (born 1969), reality-television star (Fast N' Loud), entrepreneur, auto mechanic, race car driver
- Allene Ray (1901–1979), actress
- Arthur Redcloud, actor
- Debbie Reynolds (1932–2016), Academy Award-nominated actress and singer, Singin' in the Rain, The Unsinkable Molly Brown, How the West Was Won, Mother, mother of Carrie Fisher
- Kevin Reynolds (born 1952), screenwriter, director, Robin Hood: Prince of Thieves, Red Dawn
- Christopher Rich (born 1953), actor (Another World, The Charmings)
- Patricia Richardson (born 1951), actress, Jill Taylor on Home Improvement
- Shannon Richardson (born 1977), actress
- Noah Ringer (born 1998), actor
- Carlos Rivas (1925–2003), actor
- Emilio Rivera (born 1961), actor, Marcus Álvarez on Sons of Anarchy
- Dallas Roberts (born 1970), actor
- Willard Robertson (1886–1948), actor
- Charlie Robinson (1945–2021), actor
- Gene Roddenberry (1921–1991), Star Trek creator, writer, director, producer
- Rod Roddy (1937–2003), radio and television announcer
- Holland Roden (born 1986), actress, Teen Wolf
- James Roday Rodriguez (born 1976), actor
- Michelle Rodriguez (born 1978), actress, Lost, Fast & Furious, S.W.A.T.
- Raini Rodriguez (born 1993), actress, Paul Blart: Mall Cop
- Rico Rodriguez (born 1998), teen actor, Modern Family
- Robert Rodriguez (born 1968), director, producer, writer, composer
- Ginger Rogers (1911–1995), Academy Award-winning actress, singer, dancer
- Kenny Rogers (1938–2020), musician, actor ("The Gambler", "Coward of the County")
- Kylie Rogers (born 2004), child actress, The Whispers, Collateral Beauty, Miracles from Heaven
- Henry Roquemore (1886–1943), actor
- Thomas Rosales Jr. (born 1948), stunt man
- Ross Sisters, Betsy (1926–1996), Vickie (1927–2002), and Dixie (1929–1963), Broadway singers, dancers, contortionists
- Brad Rushing (born 1964), cinematographer
- Debby Ryan (born 1993), actress, singer, voice actress
- Irene Ryan (1902–1973), actress, "Granny" on The Beverly Hillbillies
- Melissa Rycroft (born 1983), reality television contestant

S

- Mark Salling (1982–2018), actor
- Ajai Sanders (born 1967), actress, comedian
- Jay O. Sanders (born 1953), actor, Crime Story, AfterMASH, The Day After Tomorrow
- Stark Sands (born 1978), actor
- John Phillip Santos (born 1957), filmmaker, producer, journalist, author
- August Schellenberg (1936–2013), actor
- Robert Schenkkan (born 1953), actor, playwright, screenwriter
- Thomas Schlamme (born 1950), producer, director
- Julian Schnabel (born 1951), award-winning film director, visual artist
- Maïté Schwartz (born 1979), actress
- Tracy Scoggins (born 1953), actress, The Colbys, Lois & Clark, Babylon 5
- Kimberly Scott (born 1961), actress
- Kristy Scott (born 1995), social media personality, digital creator, filmmaker
- Zachary Scott (1914–1965), actor, Mildred Pierce, Cass Timberlane
- Edward Sedgwick (1892–1953), film director, writer, actor, producer
- Eileen Sedgwick (1898–1991), actress in silent films
- Joan Severance (born 1958), actress, model
- Sarah Shahi (born 1980), actress, Life, Fairly Legal, The L Word
- Shangela (born 1981), drag queen, reality television personality
- Andrew Shapter (1966–2019), film director, producer, writer, photographer
- Karen Sharpe (born 1934), actress, The High and the Mighty
- Ann Sheridan (1915–1967), actress, The Man Who Came to Dinner, Kings Row
- Taylor Sheridan (born 1970), filmmaker, actor
- Jim Siedow (1920–2003), actor
- Trinidad Silva (1950–1988), actor
- Justin Simien (born 1983), filmmaker, actor, author
- Johnny Simmons (born 1986), actor
- Lori Singer (born 1957), actress, model, classical musician
- Marc Singer (born 1948), actor, V: The Original Miniseries, V: The Final Battle, and V: The Series
- Guru Singh (born 1980), actor
- J. Mack Slaughter Jr. (born 1983), actor
- Brian J. Smith (born 1981), actor, Stargate Universe, Sense8
- Bubba Smith (1945–2011), actor, professional football player
- Jaclyn Smith (born 1947), actress, starred in Charlie's Angels
- Kimberly Kay Smith (born 1983), model, actress
- Gus Sorola (born 1978), actor, podcast host
- Eve Southern (1898–1972), actress
- Sissy Spacek (born 1949), Academy Award-winning actress, Coal Miner's Daughter, Carrie, Missing, cousin of Rip Torn
- Merrie Spaeth (born 1948), child and teen actress; now a business and political consultant and educator
- Aaron Spelling (1923–2006), television producer
- Georgina Spelvin (born 1936), adult film actress
- Brent Spiner (born 1949), actor, star of Star Trek: The Next Generation
- Kim Spradlin (born 1983), reality television personality, interior designer, business owner
- Andy Stahl (born 1952), actor, The Client, The Patriot, The Blind Side
- Nick Stahl (born 1979), actor, Sin City, The Man Without a Face, Terminator 3: Rise of the Machines
- Jimmy Starr (1904–1991), screenwriter, columnist
- Jack Starrett (1936–1989), actor, director
- Eddie Steeples (born 1973), actor
- Jennifer Stone (born 1993), actress
- Matt Stone (born 1971), animator, voice actor, cocreator of South Park with Trey Parker
- Ptosha Storey (born 1974), actress
- Gale Storm (1922–2009), actress, singer
- Glenn Strange (1899–1973), actor
- Sherry Stringfield (born 1967), actress, NYPD Blue, ER
- David Sullivan (born 1977), actor
- Allison Sumrall (born 1979), voice actress
- Don Swayze (born 1958), actor
- Patrick Swayze (1952–2009), actor, Dirty Dancing, The Outsiders, Road House, Ghost
- Madylin Sweeten (born 1991), actress, Everybody Loves Raymond
- Clarence Swensen (1917–2009), actor
- Francie Swift (born 1968), actress, Gossip Girl

T–U

- Ralph Tabakin (1921–2001), actor, Homicide: Life on the Street
- Margaret Tallichet (1914–1991), actress
- Lincoln Tate (1934–2001), actor, Legend of the Lone Ranger
- Sharon Tate (1943–1969), actress, Valley of the Dolls
- Regina Taylor (born 1960), actress, Molly Blane on The Unit; playwright
- Ron Taylor (1952–2002), actor
- Erica Tazel (born 1977), actress
- Anthony 'Scooter' Teague (1940–1989), actor, dancer
- Mason Thames (born 2007), actor
- Henry Thomas (born 1971), actor, E.T. the Extra-Terrestrial, Gangs of New York, All the Pretty Horses
- Jay Thomas (1948–2017), actor, Mr. Holland's Opus, Cheers
- Tiffany Thornton (born 1986), actress
- Stephen Tobolowsky (born 1951), actor, Bob Bishop on Heroes, Ned Ryerson in Groundhog Day
- Rip Torn (1931–2019), Academy Award-nominated actor, Cross Creek, Sweet Bird of Youth, The Cincinnati Kid, Defending Your Life, The Larry Sanders Show, cousin of Sissy Spacek
- Stacey Travis (born 1964), actress
- Jesús Salvador Treviño (born 1946), television director
- Barry Tubb (born 1963), actor, director
- Alan Tudyk (born 1971), actor, Firefly
- Tommy Tune (born 1939), dancer, actor, Broadway director, choreographer
- Paola Turbay (born 1970), actress, model, The Secret Life of the American Teenager, Cane
- Janine Turner (born 1962), model, actress, author, radio talk show host
- Karri Turner (born 1966), actress, JAG
- Maidel Turner (1888–1953), film actress
- Meg Turney (born 1987), internet personality, cosplayer, model, vlogger
- Michael Urie (born 1980), actor, Ugly Betty

V–Z

- Brenda Vaccaro (born 1939), Academy Award-nominated actress, Once Is Not Enough, Midnight Cowboy, Airport '77
- Jack Valenti (1921–2007), president of the Motion Picture Association of America (MPAA), 1966–2004; special assistant to U.S. President Lyndon B. Johnson
- Greg Vaughan (born 1973), actor, former fashion model, General Hospital, Days of Our Lives, Charmed
- Conrad Vernon (born 1968), voice actor, writer, director, the Shrek movies, the Madagascar movies, Monsters vs. Aliens
- Florence Vidor (1895–1977), actress
- King Vidor (1894–1982), film director, producer
- Libby Villari (born 1951), actress
- J. R. Villarreal (born 1992), actor, producer
- Tom Virtue (born 1957), actor, Even Stevens, Blades of Glory
- Elda Voelkel (1911–2001), actress; later documentary filmmaker (as Elda Hartley)
- Lenny Von Dohlen (1958–2022), actor
- Helen Wagner (1918–2010), actress, played Nancy Hughes on As the World Turns for 54 years
- Charlotte Walker (1876–1958), actress
- Jordan Wall (born 1981), actor
- Isaiah Washington (born 1963), actor, Dr. Preston Burke on Grey's Anatomy
- Barry Watson (born 1974), actor
- Ann Wedgeworth (1934–2017), actress, Lana on Three's Company
- Debbie Weems (1950–1978), actress, singer, Captain Kangaroo
- Peter Weller (born 1947), actor, RoboCop, Star Trek Into Darkness
- Noël Wells (born 1986), actress, comedian
- Bob West (born 1956), actor, Barney & Friends
- Margaret West (1903–1963), vaudeville performer, radio hostess, heiress
- Lisa Whelchel (born 1963), actress, author
- Forest Whitaker (born 1961), Academy Award-winning actor and director, The Last King of Scotland, Bird, Good Morning, Vietnam, Panic Room, Lee Daniels' The Butler
- Johnny Whitworth (born 1975), actor, CSI: Miami
- Caroline Williams (born 1957), actress
- Guinn Williams (1899–1962), actor
- JoBeth Williams (born 1948), actress, Poltergeist, The Big Chill, Screen Actors Guild president
- Ryan Piers Williams (born 1981), actor, director, writer
- Van Williams (1934–2016), actor
- Noble Willingham (1931–2004), actor, Walker, Texas Ranger
- Travis Willingham (born 1981), actor, voice actor
- Chill Wills (1903–1978), Academy Award-nominated actor and singer
- Andrew Wilson (born 1964), actor
- Chandra Wilson (born 1969), actress, Miranda Bailey on Grey's Anatomy
- Dooley Wilson (1886–1953), actor, singer, played "Sam" in Casablanca
- Luke Wilson (born 1971), actor, Bottle Rocket, The Royal Tenenbaums, Idiocracy
- Owen Wilson (born 1968), actor, The Darjeeling Limited, Midnight in Paris, Cars
- Robert Wilson (1941–2025), theatre director, playwright
- Trey Wilson (1948–1989), actor, Bull Durham, Raising Arizona
- William D. Wittliff (1940–2019), screenwriter, author, photographer
- Morgan Woodward (1925–2019), actor, Dallas, The Life and Legend of Wyatt Earp, Gunsmoke
- Doug Wright (born 1962), Pulitzer Prize- and Tony Award-winning playwright, screenwriter
- Robin Wright (born 1966), actress, The Princess Bride, House of Cards
- Natalie Zea (born 1975), actress, Justified, Dirty Sexy Money
- Nora Zehetner (born 1981), actress
- Renée Zellweger (born 1969), Academy Award-winning actress, Cold Mountain, Jerry Maguire, Chicago
- Craig Zisk (born 1950), television director, producer
- Randy Zisk (born 1959), television director, producer

=== Comedians ===
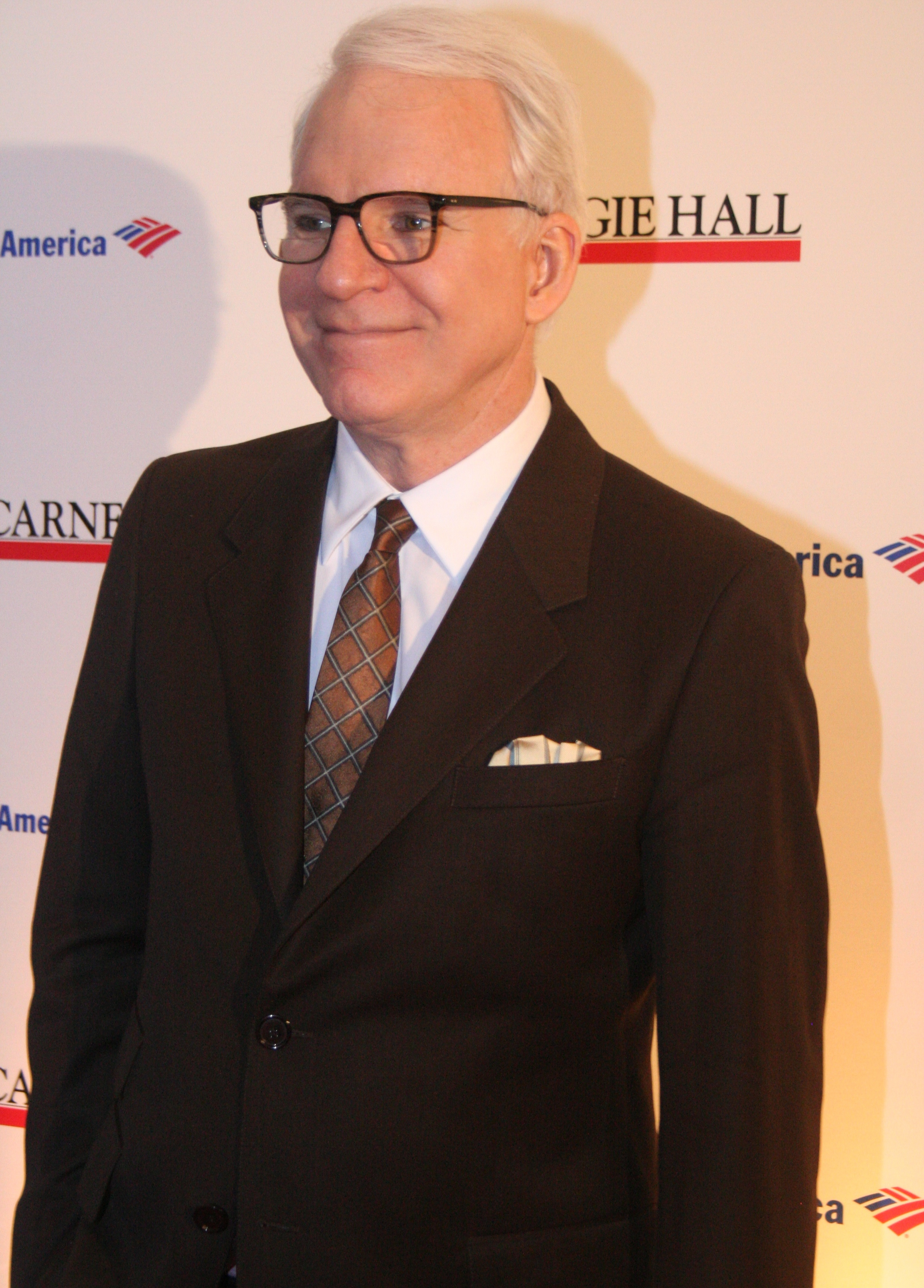
Steve Martin

- Cristela Alonzo (born 1979), comedian, actress
- Aaron Aryanpur, stand-up comedian
- Rodney Carrington (born 1968), comedian
- Wyatt Cenac (born 1976), stand-up comedian, actor, writer
- Ryan Cownie, stand-up comedian
- Kambri Crews (born 1971), comedic storyteller, memoirist
- Jeff Dunham (born 1962), ventriloquist, stand-up comedian
- Jade Esteban Estrada (born 1975), comedian, actor
- Bill Engvall (born 1957), comedian, actor
- Jack Handey (born 1949), writer for Saturday Night Live
- Bill Hicks (1961–1994), comedian
- KevJumba (Kevin Wu) (born 1990), comedian, YouTube celebrity
- Lashonda Lester (1975–2017), comedian
- Freddy Lockhart (born 1979), comedian, actor
- Steve Martin (born 1945), comedian, actor
- Rasika Mathur (born 1976), comedian, actress, Wild 'n Out
- Ralphie May (1972–2017), comedian
- Doug Mellard, stand-up comedian
- Grady Nutt (1934–1982), humorist, Baptist minister
- Alex Reymundo, comedian, actor
- Iliza Shlesinger (born 1983), comedian
- Shuckey Duckey (Cecil Armstrong) (born 1956), comedian, circus ringmaster
- Freddy Soto (1970–2005), comedian, actor
- Ryan Stout (born 1982), comedian
- Greg Travis (born 1958), actor, stand-up comedian
- Paul Varghese (born 1977), comedian
- Devon Walker (born 1991), comedian
- Stephnie Weir (born 1967), comedian, actress, MADtv
- Ron White (born 1956), comedian, actor
- Harris Wittels (1984–2015), comedian, actor, writer, producer, musician
- Dustin Ybarra (born 1989), comedian, actor

=== Magicians ===
- Jay Alexander (born 1958), magician
- J.B. Bobo (1910–1996), magician
- Richard Turner (born 1954), magician specializing in card manipulation
- Mark Wilson (1929–2021), magician

=== Music ===
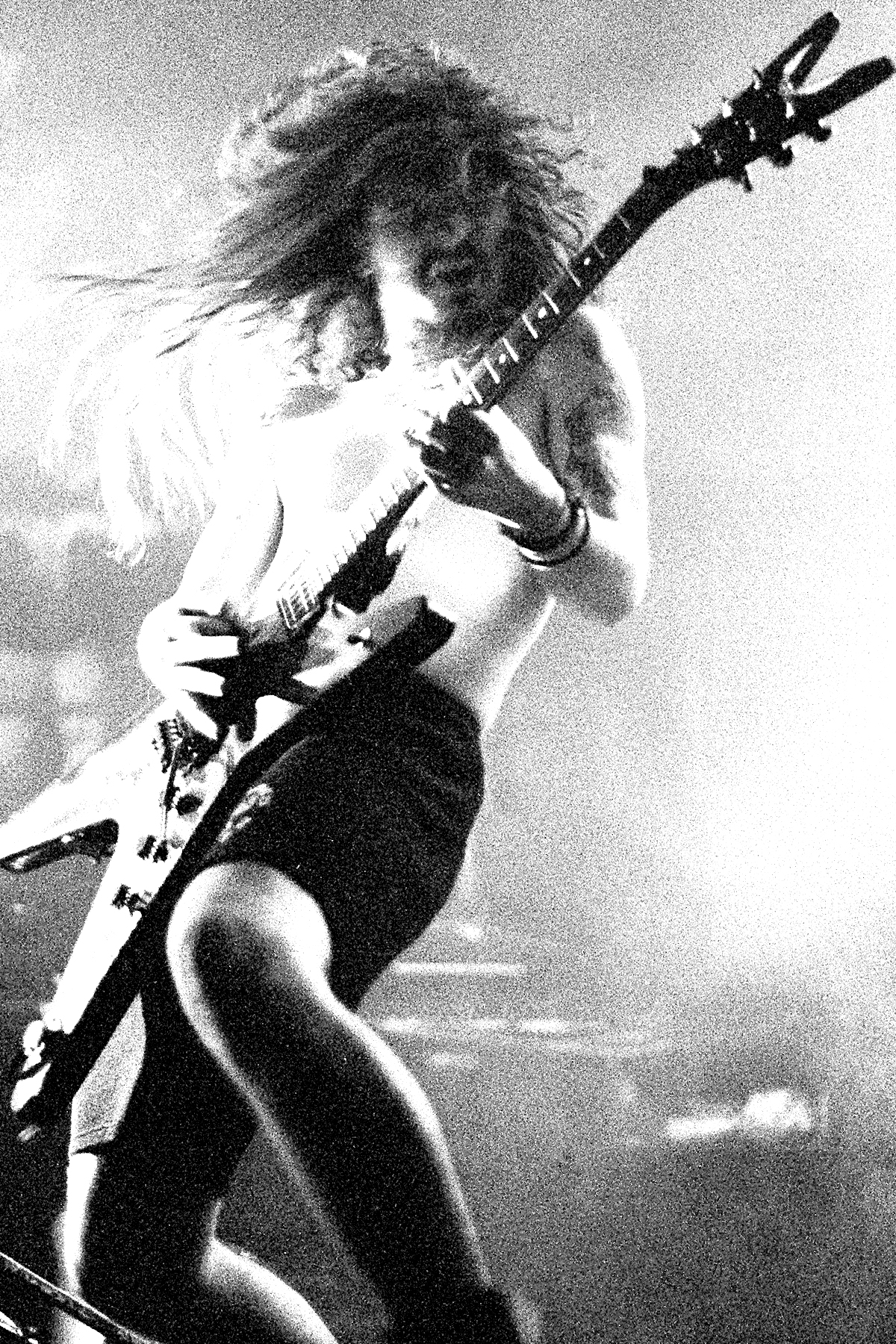
"Dimebag" Darrell Abbott

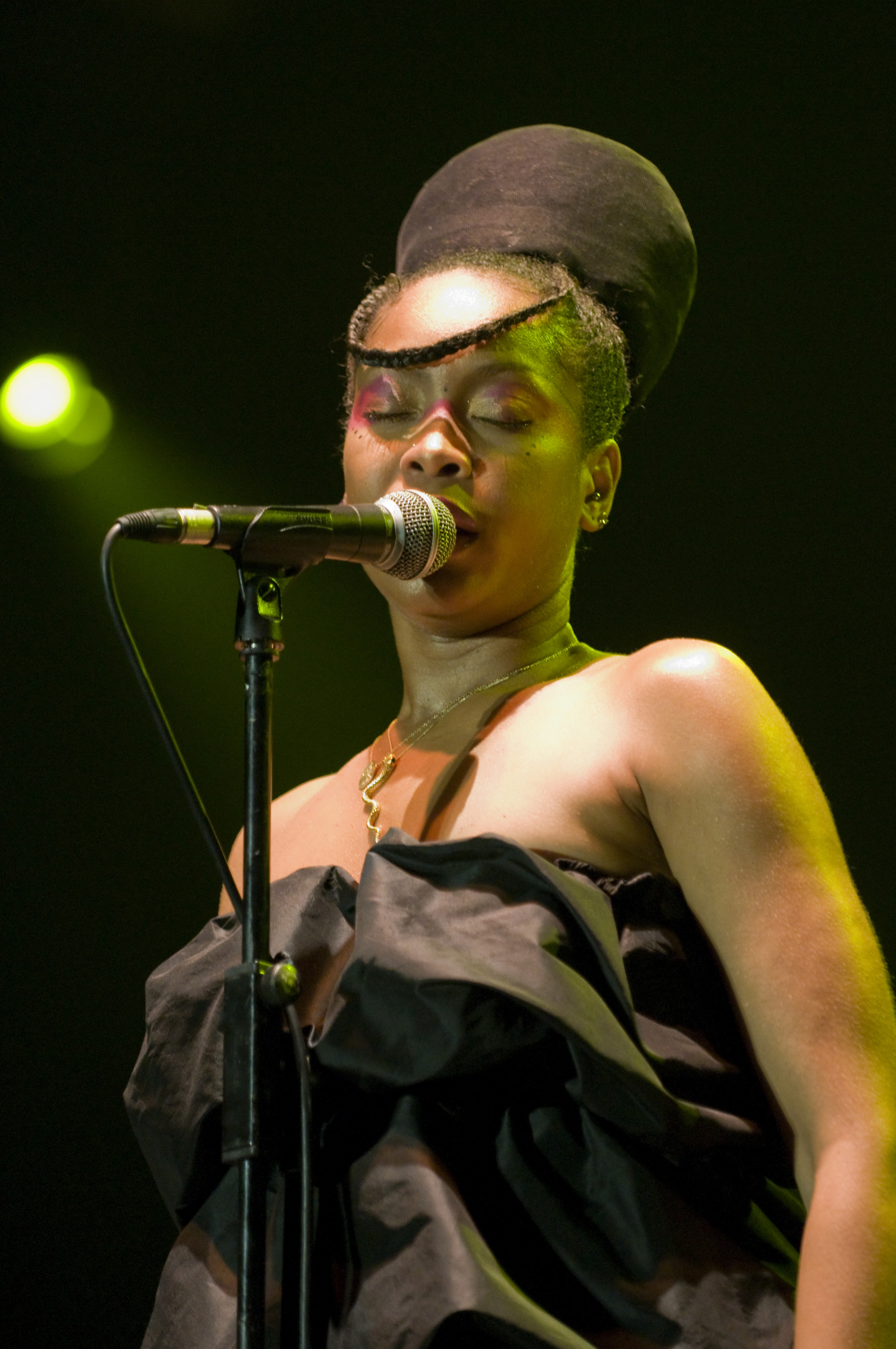
Erykah Badu

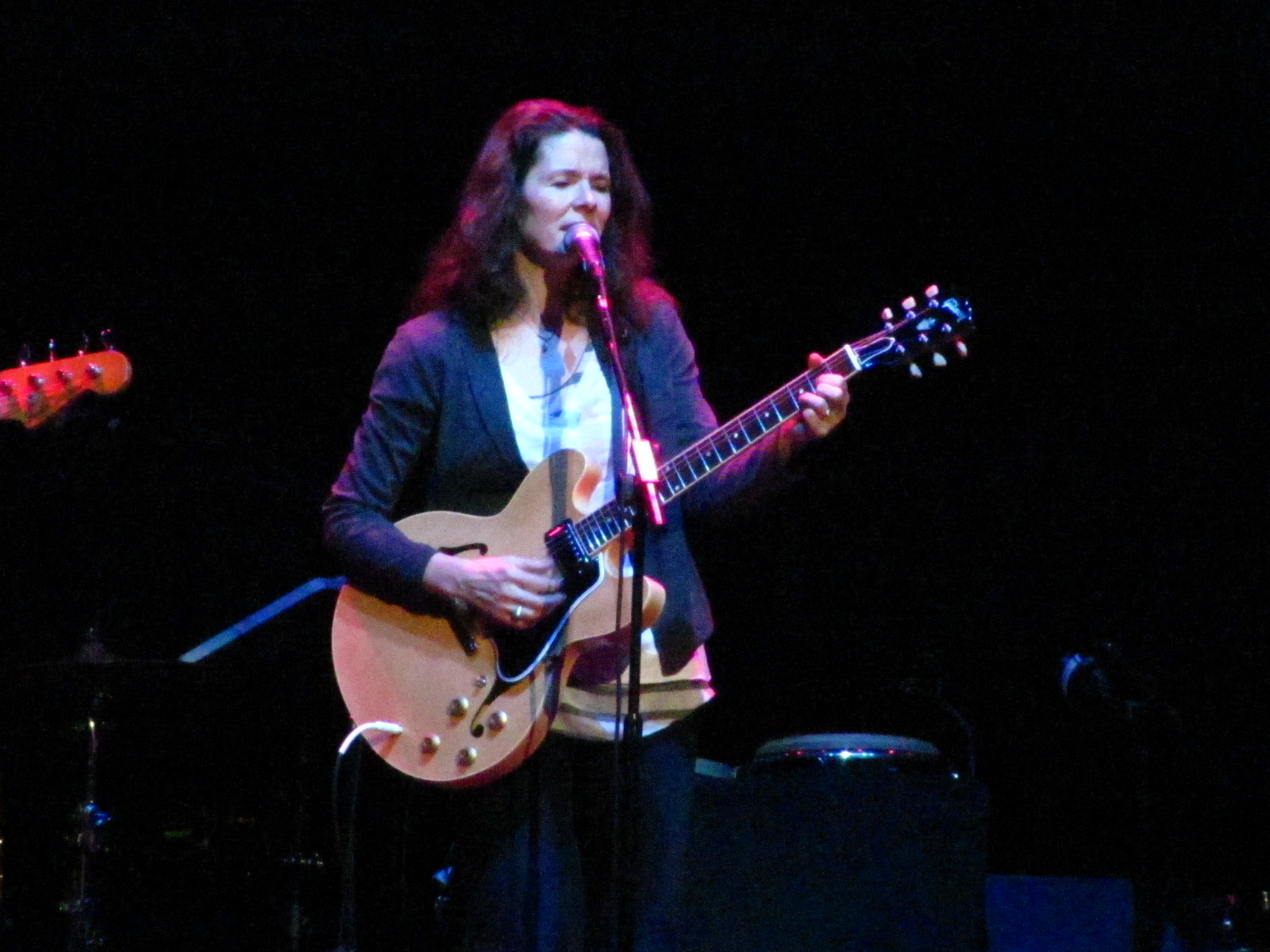
Edie Brickell

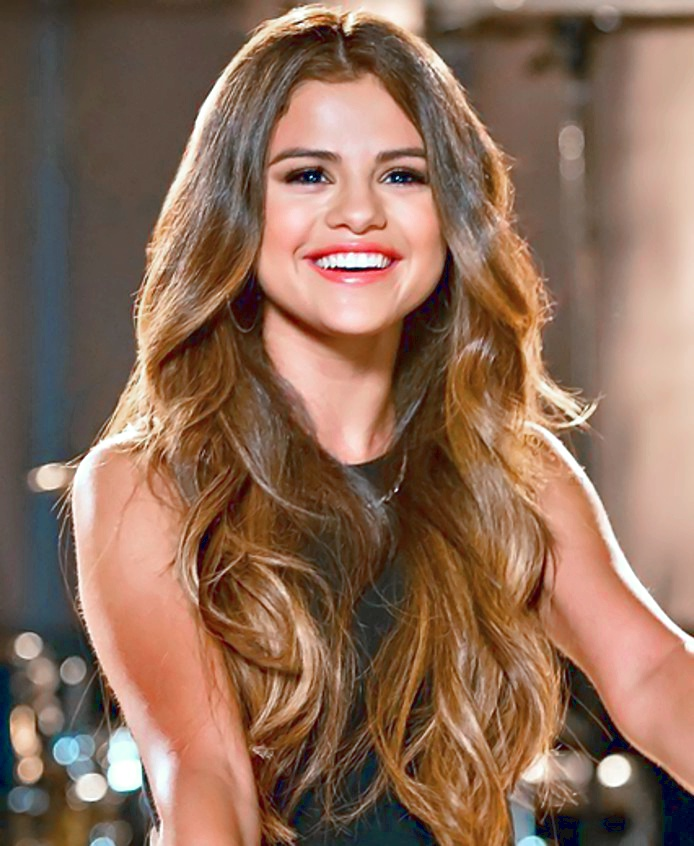
Selena Gomez

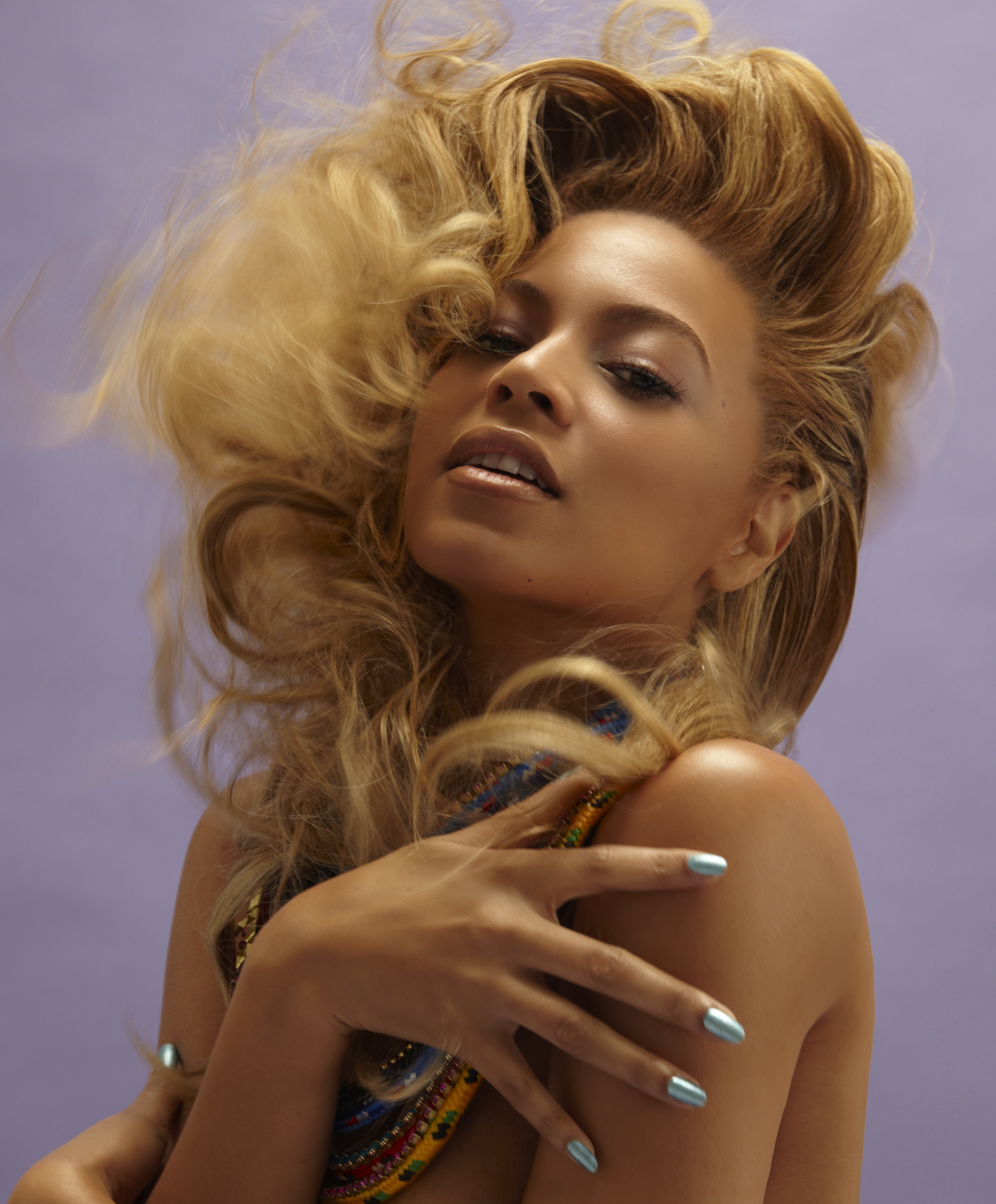
Beyoncé

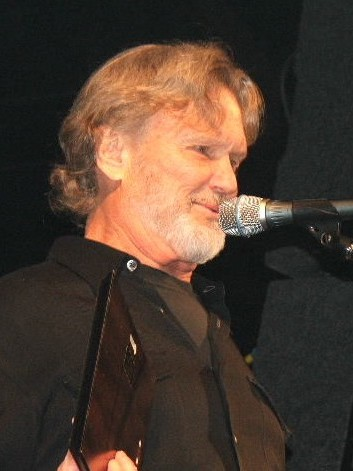
Kris Kristofferson

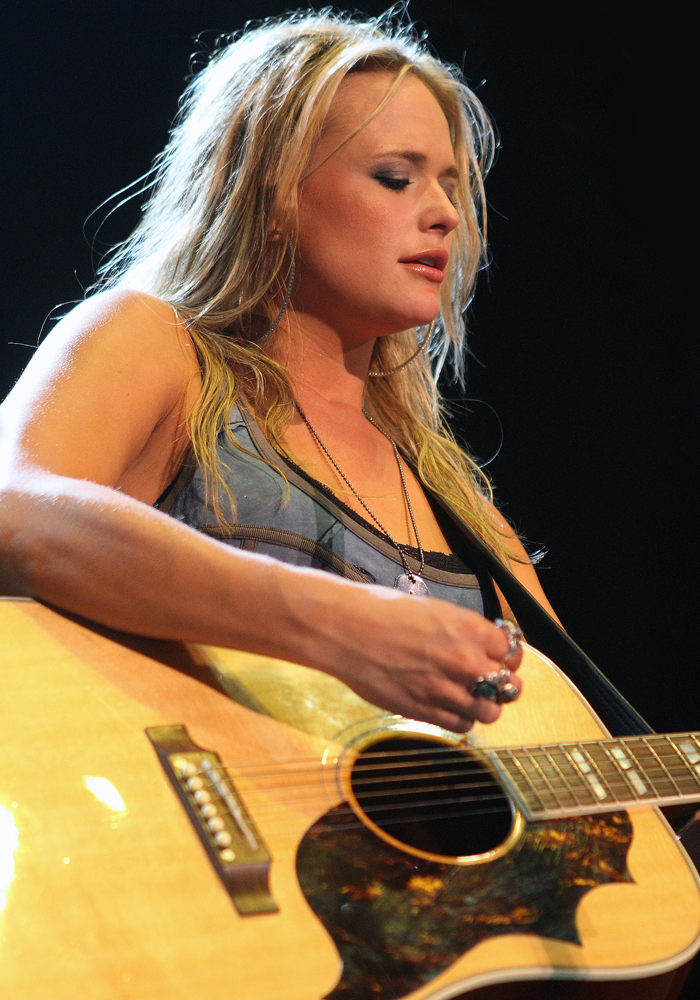
Miranda Lambert

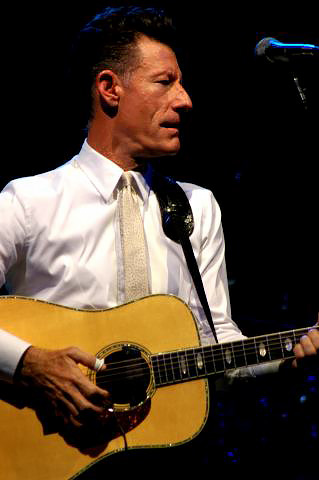
Lyle Lovett

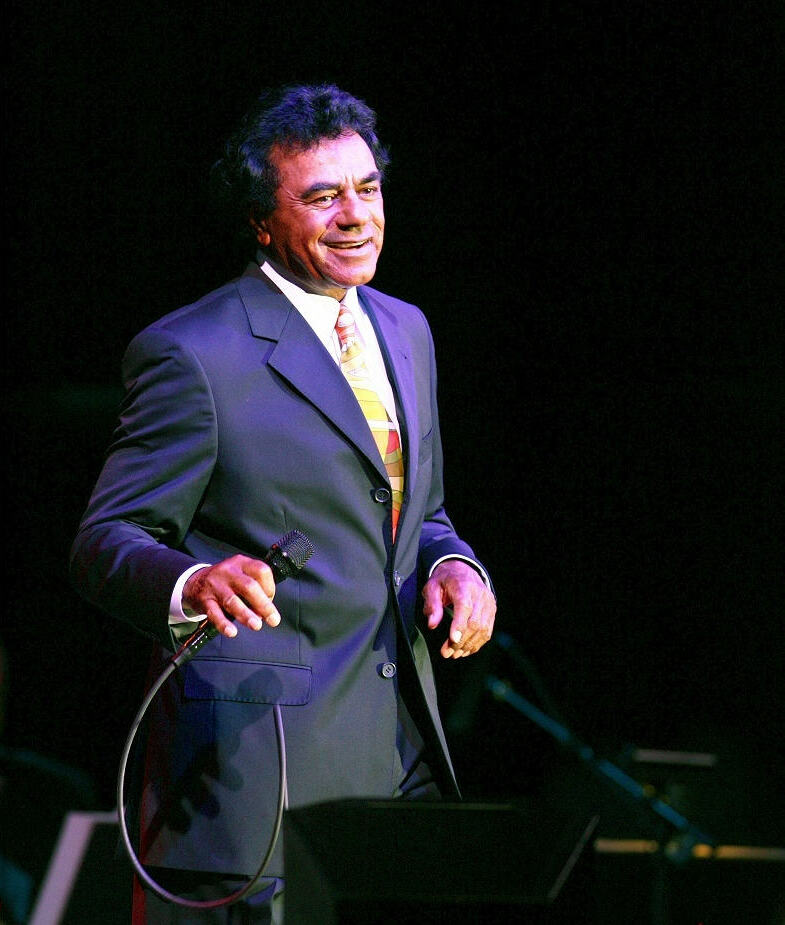
Johnny Mathis

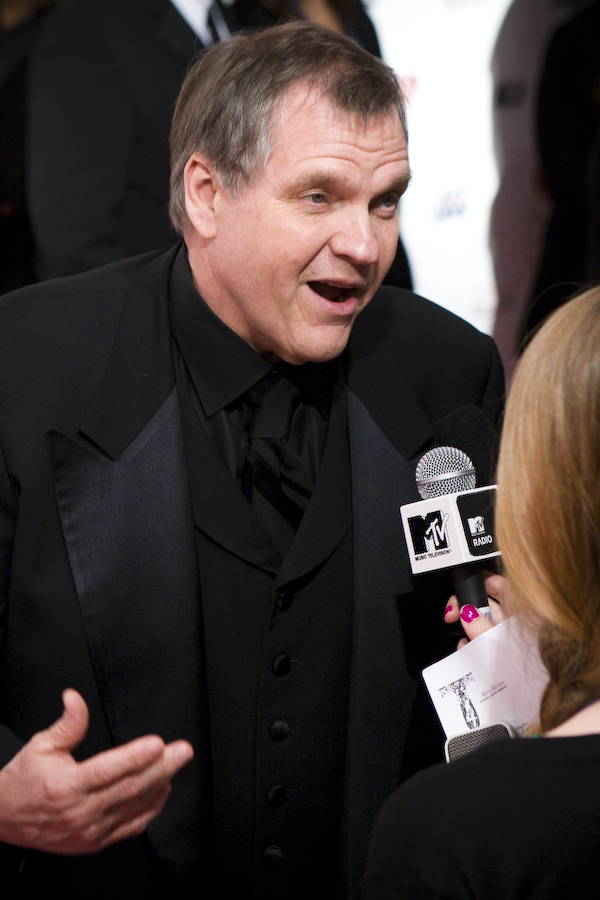
Meat Loaf

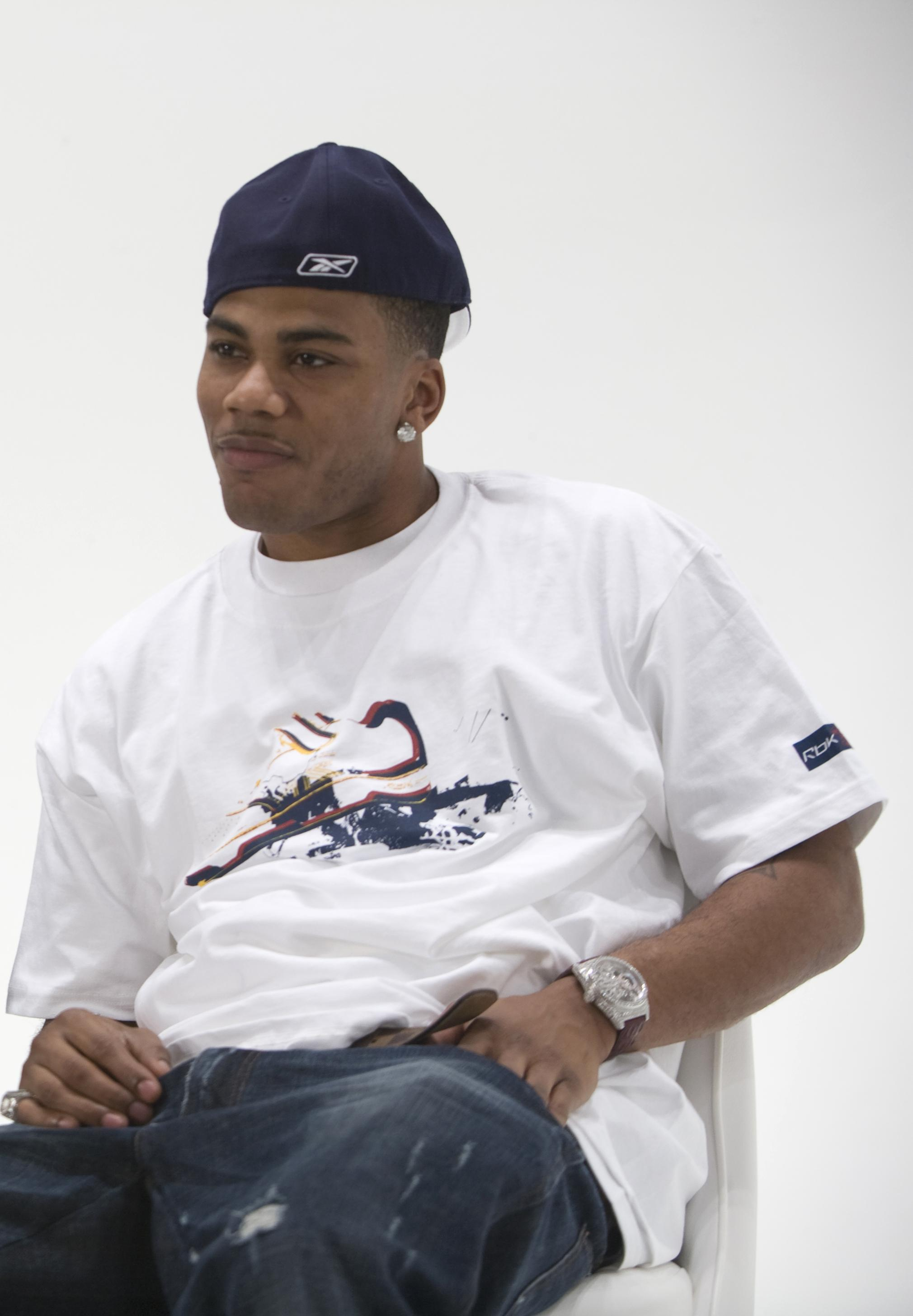
Nelly

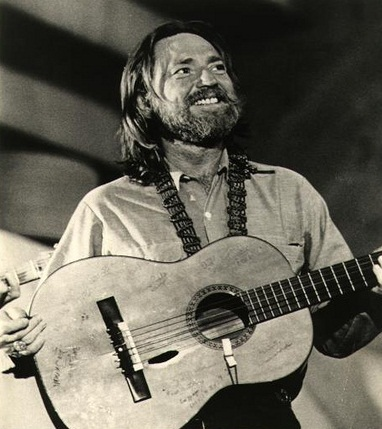
Willie Nelson

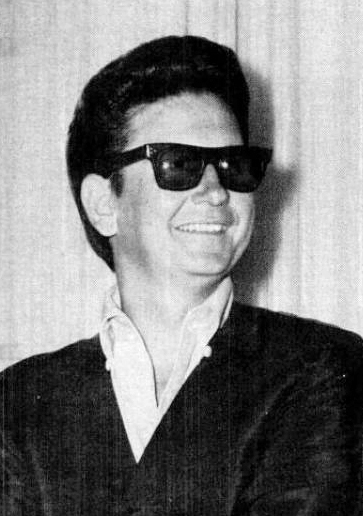
Roy Orbison

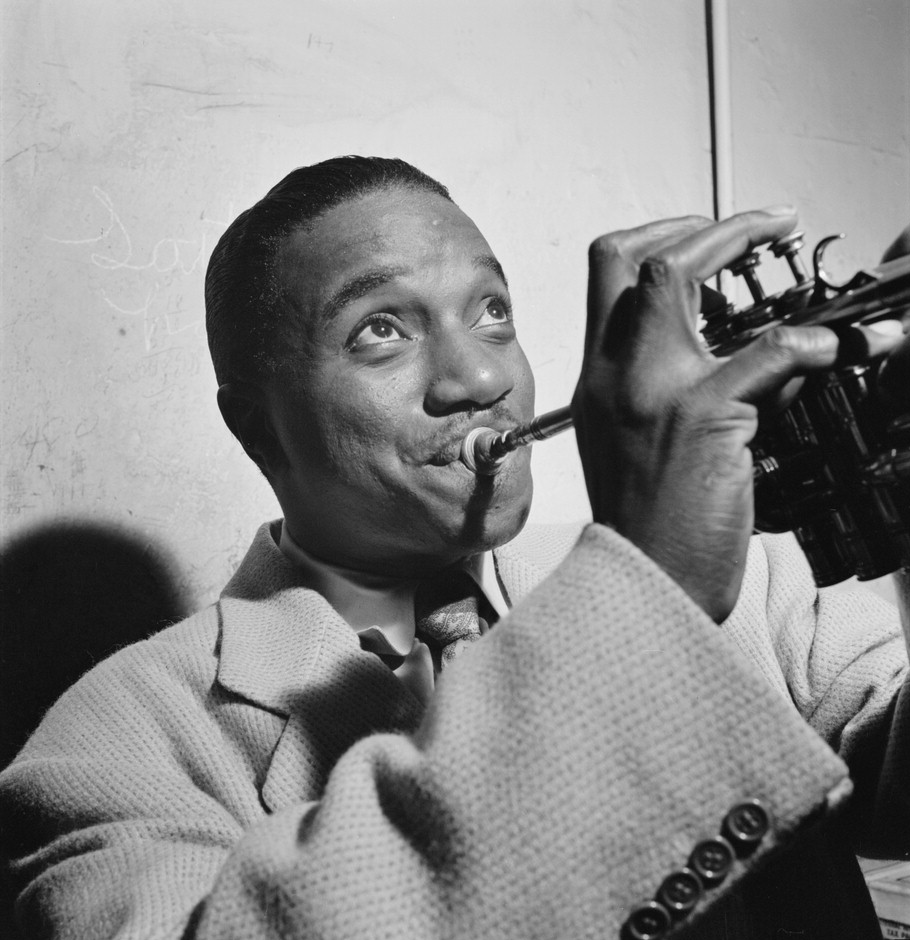
Hot Lips Page

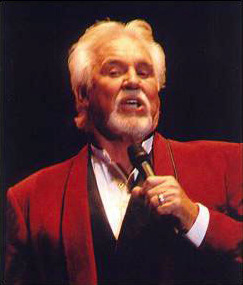
Kenny Rogers

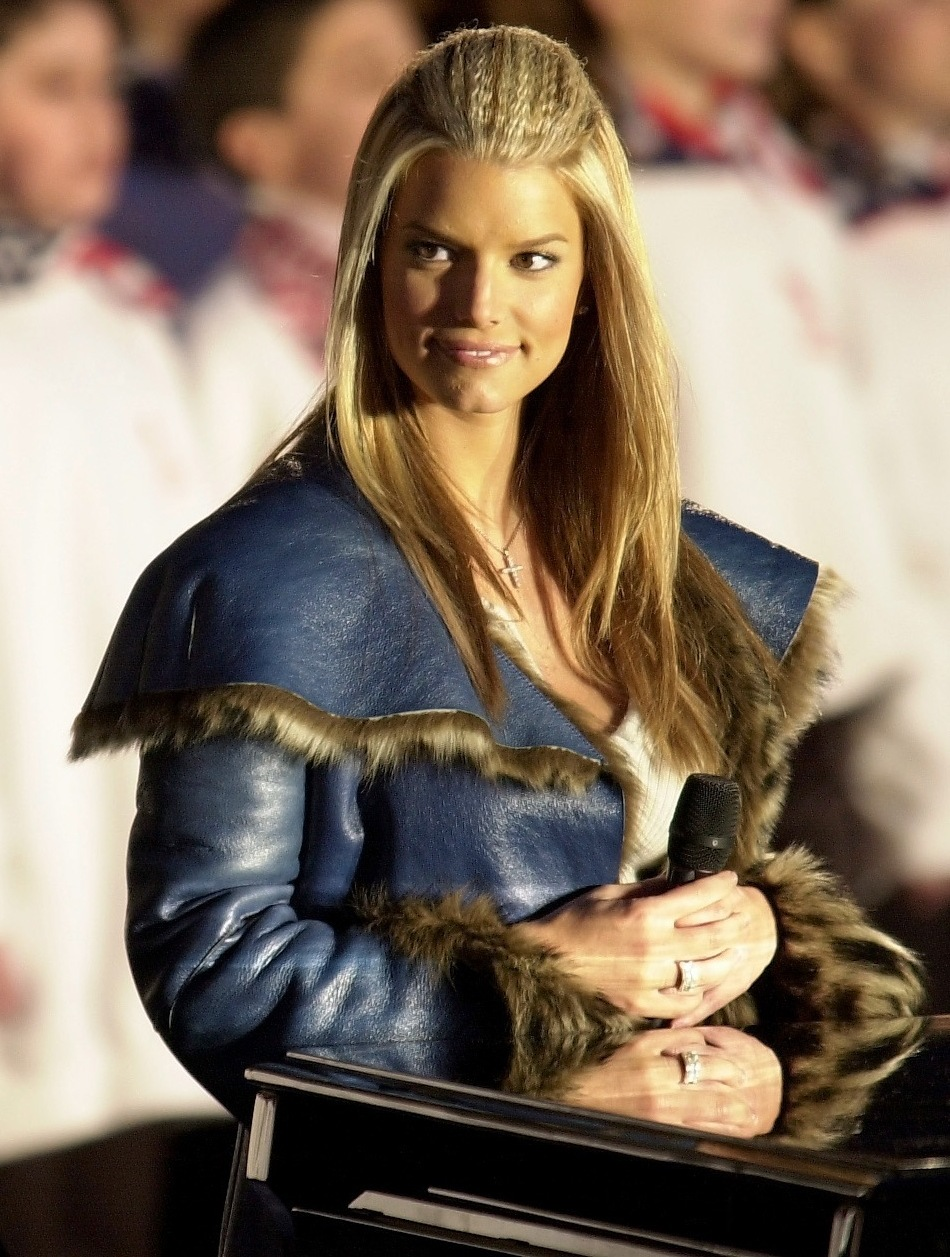
Jessica Simpson

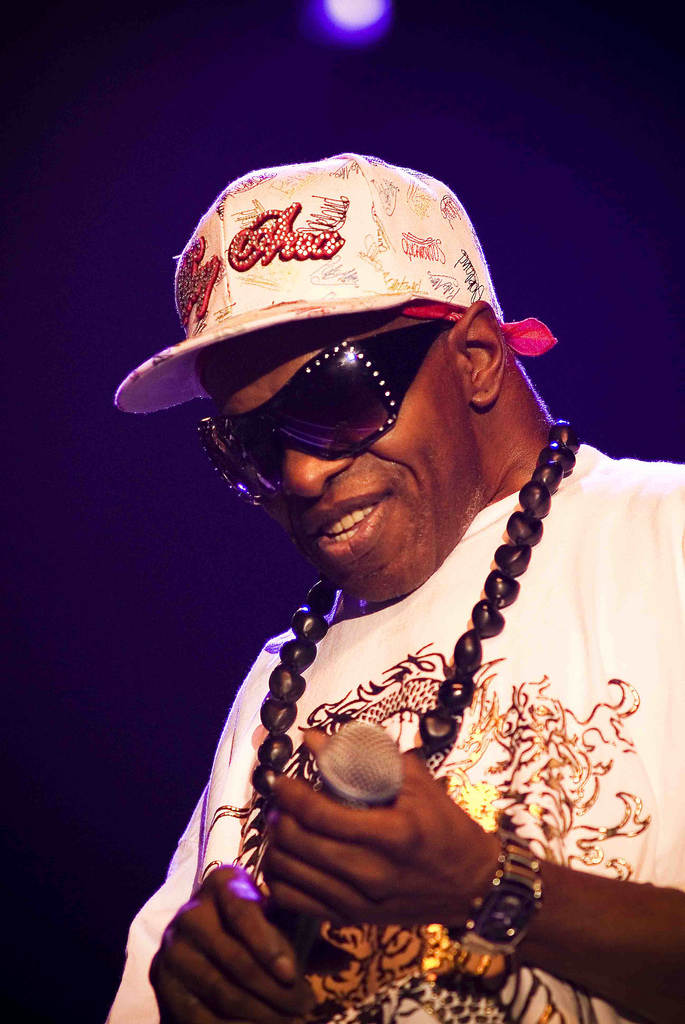
Sly Stone

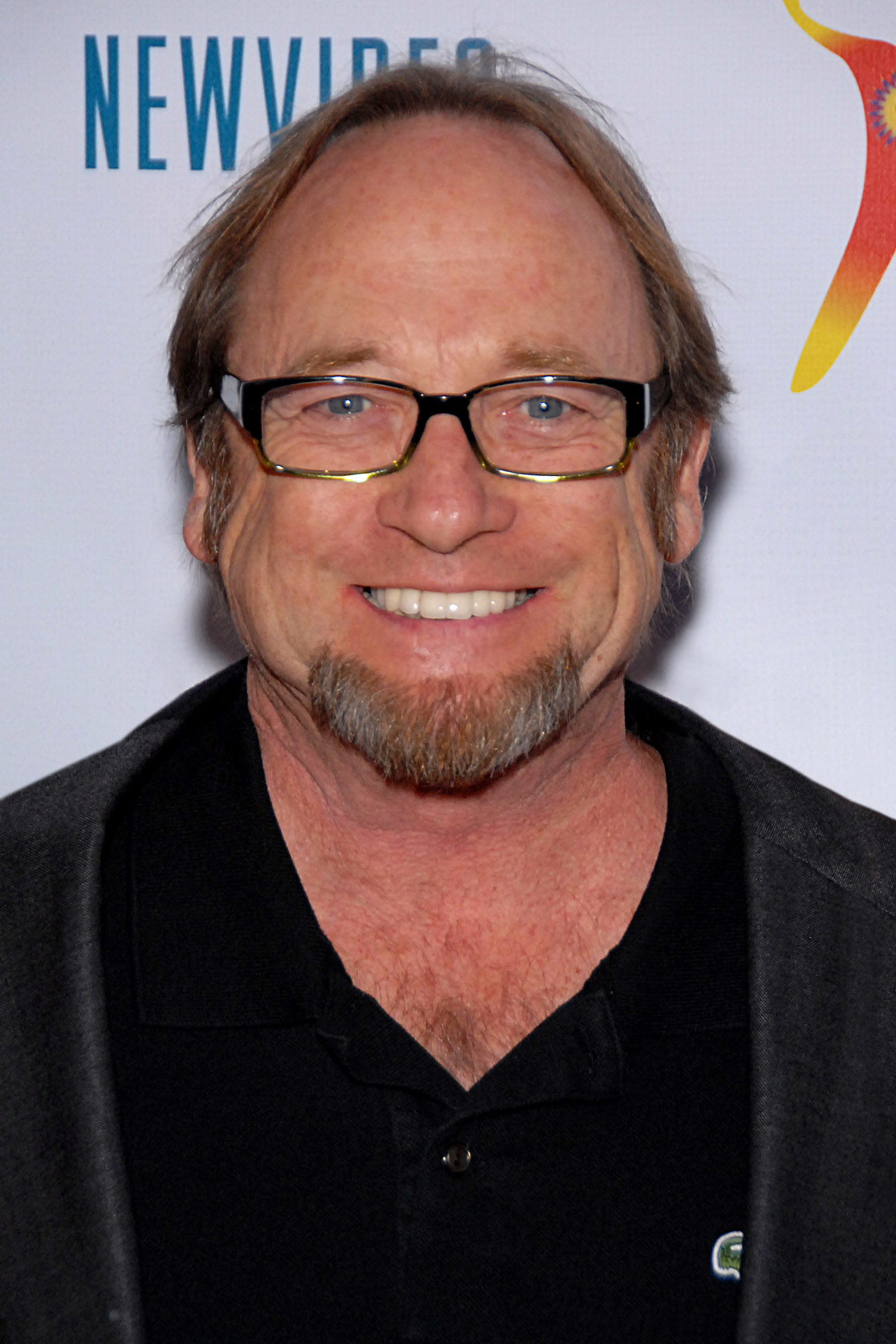
Stephen Stills

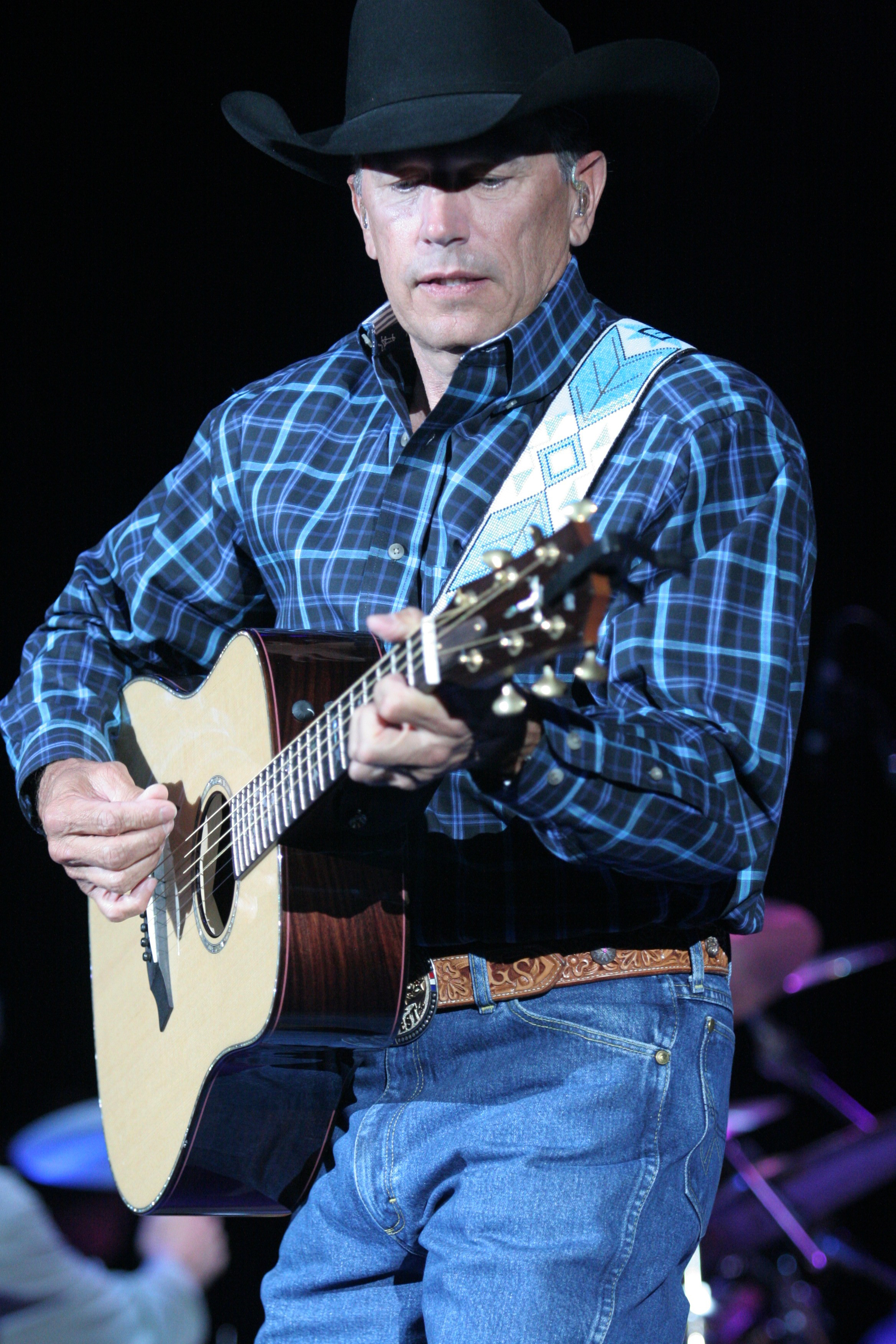
George Strait

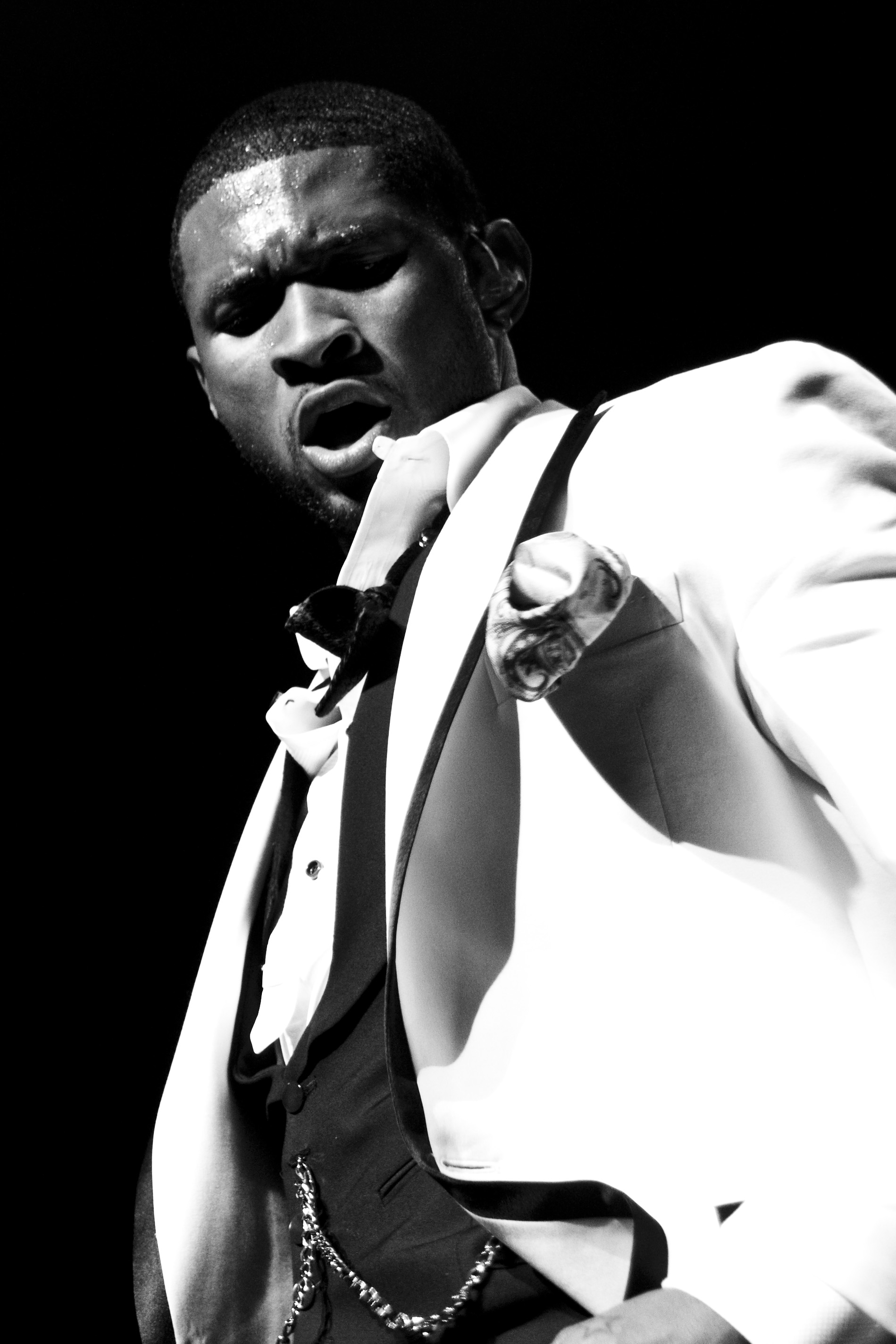
Usher

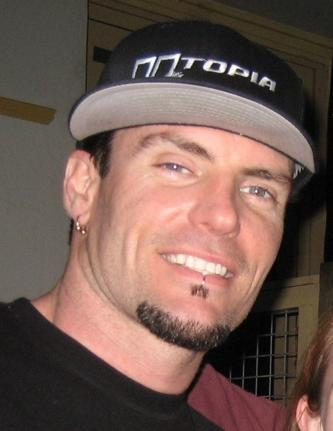
Vanilla Ice

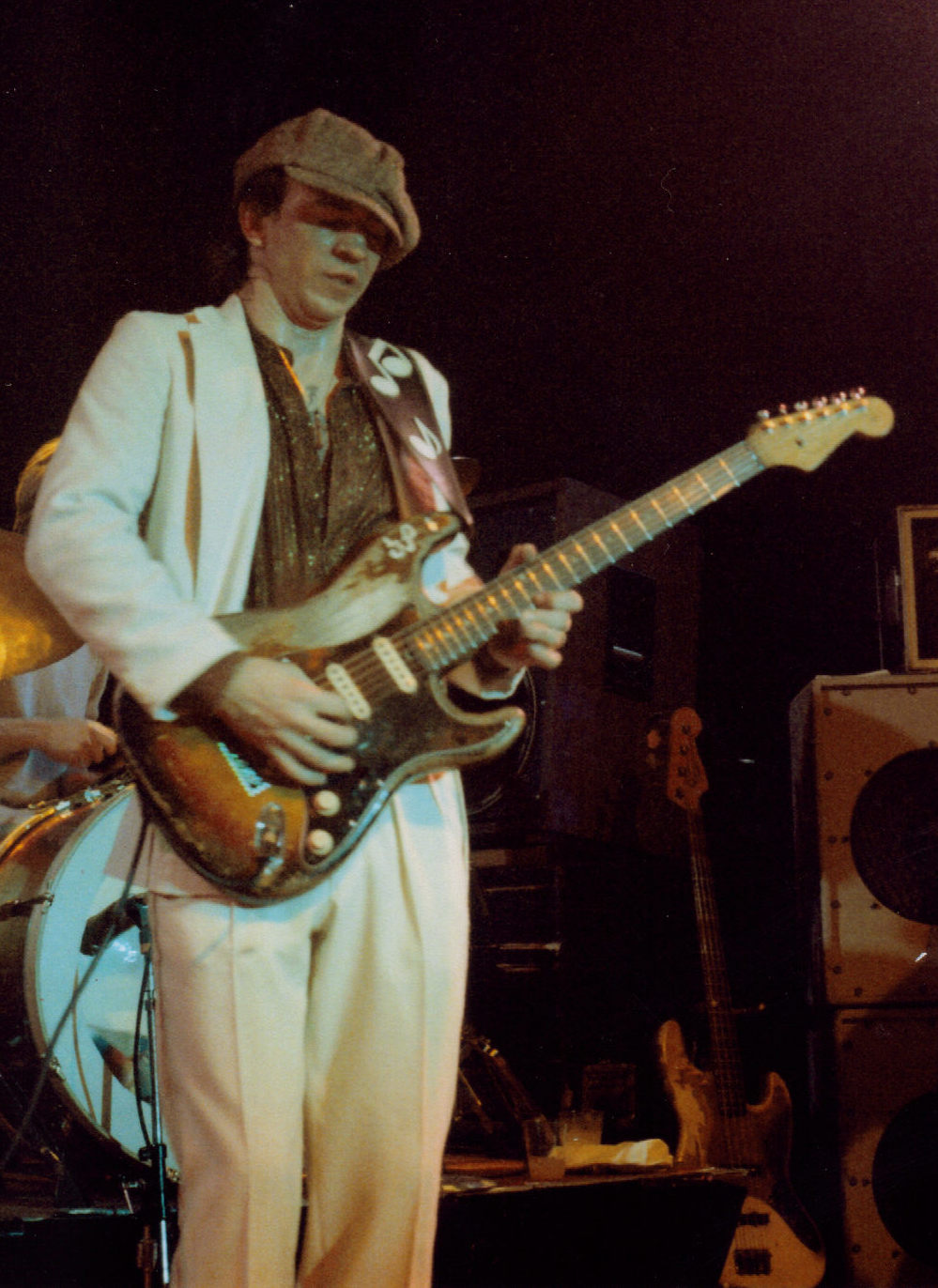
Stevie Ray Vaughan

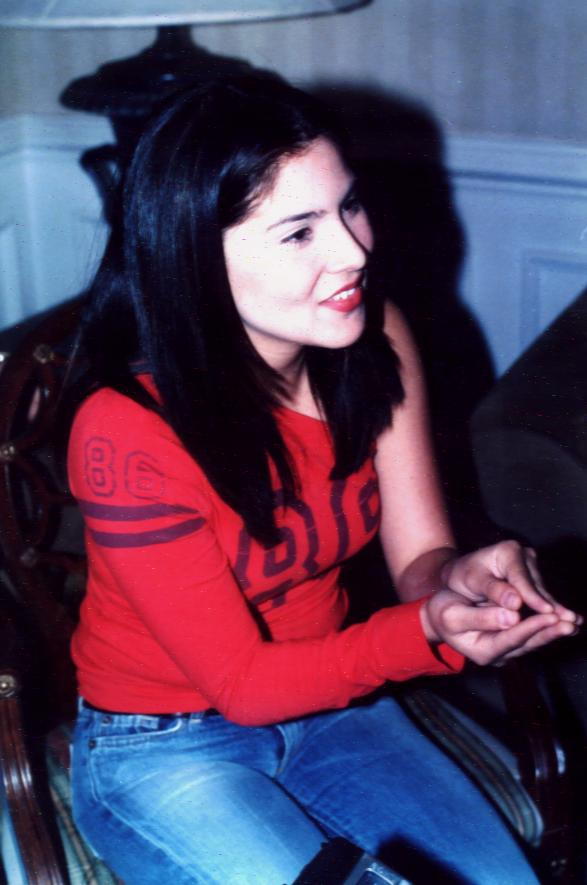
Jaci Velasquez

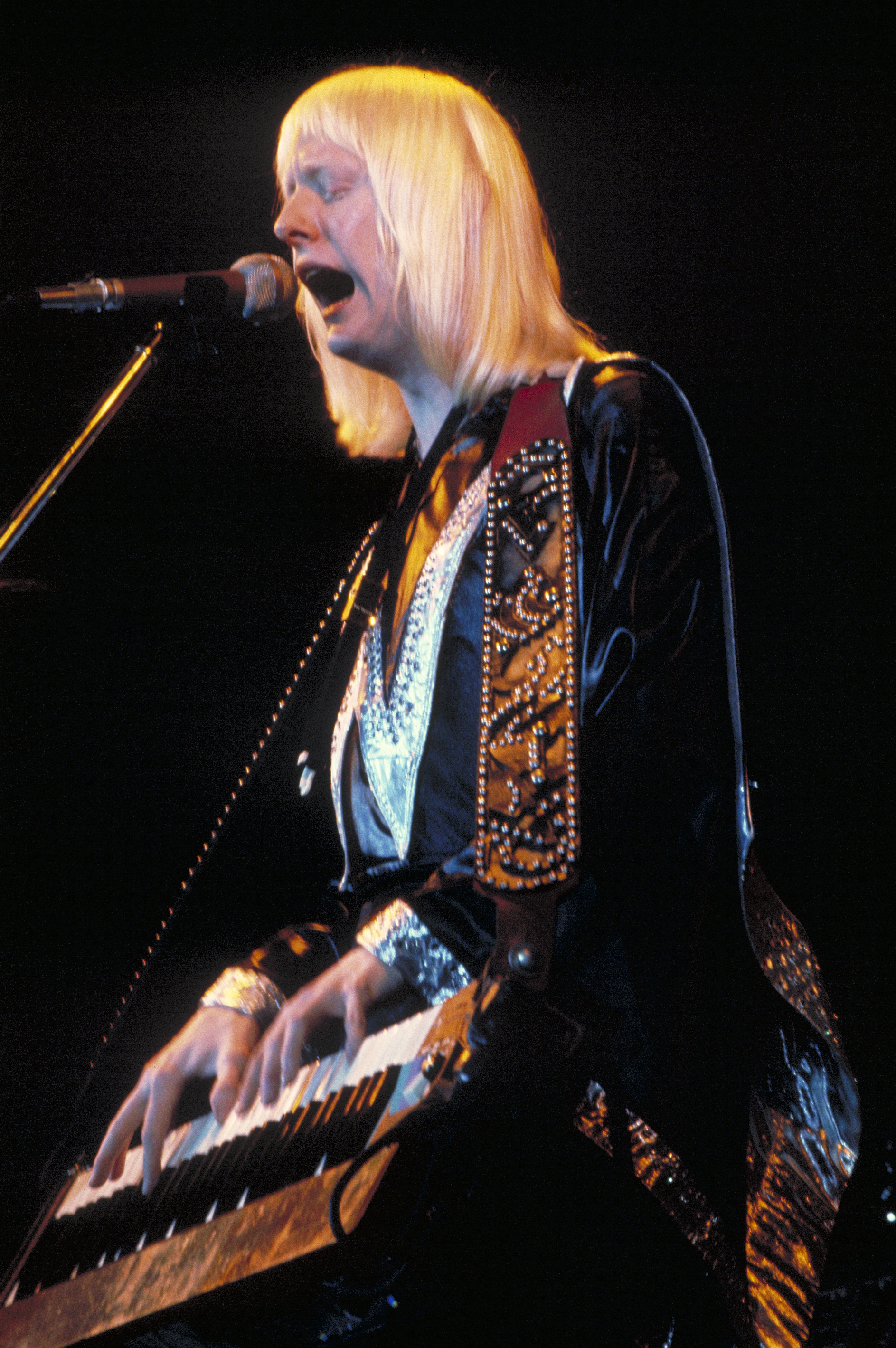
Edgar Winter

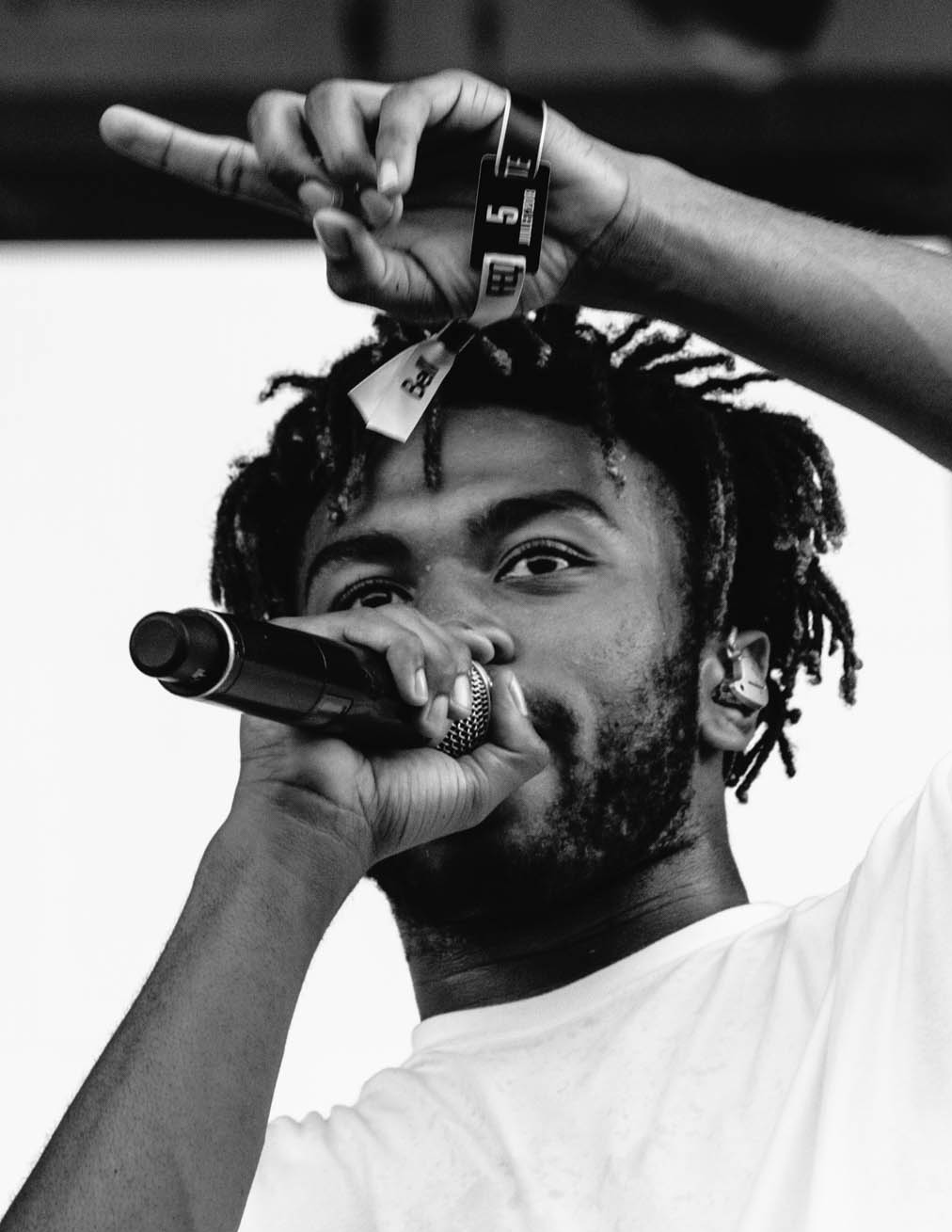
Kevin Abstract

0–9

- 3Bubble and J. Gray, hip hop duo

A

- Dimebag Darrell Abbott (1966–2004), rock guitarist
- Jerry Abbott (1944–2024), country songwriter, producer
- Dave Abbruzzese (born 1968), rock drummer
- Jacques Abram (1915–1998), classical pianist
- Kevin Abstract (Clifford Ian Simpson) (born 1996), rapper, singer-songwriter, director
- Yolanda Adams (born 1961), Grammy Award-winning gospel singer
- Samuel Adler (born 1928), composer, conductor, educator
- Pepe Aguilar (born 1968), ranchera/mariachi/pop singer-songwriter
- Hanan Alattar (born 1986), opera singer
- Don Albert (1908–1980), jazz trumpeter, bandleader
- Carter Albrecht (1973–2007), rock keyboardist, guitarist, classical pianist
- Victor Alessandro (1915–1976), conductor
- Abraham Alexander, musician, songwriter
- Alger "Texas" Alexander (1900–1954), blues singer
- Dave Alexander (aka Omar Sharriff) (1938–2012), blues singer, pianist
- Terry Allen (born 1943), musician
- Jerry Allison (1939–2022), musician
- Joe Allison (1924–2002), country songwriter, producer
- Ruby Allmond (1923–2006), country songwriter, fiddler, guitarist
- Tommy Allsup (1931–2017), rock/country guitarist
- Nancy Ames (born 1937), pop/folk singer
- Trey Anastasio (born 1964), rock singer/guitarist
- Christopher M. Anderson, college band director
- Coffey Anderson (born 1978), country singer-songwriter
- Keith Anderson (born 1970), jazz saxophonist
- Robert Theodore Anderson (1934–2009), classical organist, composer, educator
- Ryan Anthony (1969–2020), trumpet player
- Clifford Antone (1949–2006), blues club owner, record producer, mentor to musicians
- Charlie Applewhite (1932–2001), singer, radio host
- Katie Armiger (born 1991), country singer
- Elaine Arnold (1911–2006), opera singer
- Lev Aronson (1912–1988), classical cellist and teacher
- Charline Arthur (1929–1987), boogie-woogie/blues singer
- Gil Askey (1925–2014), jazz/Motown trumpet player, composer
- Gene Austin (1900–1972), pop/jazz singer-songwriter
- James Austin (born 1937), classical trumpet player, educator
- Larry Austin (1930–2018), composer, educator
- Gene Autry (1907–1998), country music singer
- John Axelrod (born 1966), classical conductor
- Pedro Ayala (1911–1990), conjunto accordionist-songwriter

Ba–Bm

- Harry Babasin (1921–1988), jazz bassist
- Erykah Badu (born 1971), R&B and hip hop singer
- Zuill Bailey (born 1972), classical cellist
- Wilfred Bain (1908–1997), music educator
- Edward A. Baird (1933–2000), classical/opera singer, conductor, educator
- Zac Baird (born 1971), rock keyboardist
- George C. Baker (born 1951), classical organist, composer, educator
- Sam Baker (born 1954), folk singer-songwriter, survived a terrorist bombing attack by Shining Path
- Marcia Ball (born 1949), blues singer
- Clint Ballard Jr. (1931–2008), songwriter
- Smith Ballew (1902–1984), singer, bandleader, actor
- Moe Bandy (born 1944), country singer
- Kirko Bangz (born 1989), southern hip hop music and R&B singer
- Erica Banks (born 1998), rapper
- Joseph Banowetz (1936–2022), classical pianist, teacher
- Stephen Barber (born 1952), symphonic/pop/rock composer, arranger
- Danny Barnes (born 1961), country/jazz/punk banjo player and guitarist
- Etta Moten Barnett (1901–2004), singer, actress
- Les Baxter (1922–1996), composer of lounge music and exotica
- Frank Beard (1949–2026), drummer in ZZ Top
- John Beasley (born 1960), jazz pianist, bandleader, producer
- George Beauchamp (1899–1941), maker and inventor of violins and guitars
- Jim Beck (1916–1956), country music talent agent, record promoter, recording studio owner, A&R engineer, record producer, music publisher
- Dora Valesca Becker (1870–1958), classical violinist
- Leila Bela (born 1970), musician, writer, actress (born in Tehran, Iran, immigrated to Austin)
- Archie Bell (born 1944), singer (Archie Bell & the Drells)
- Jesse Belvin (1932–1960), R&B pianist, singer-songwriter
- Tex Beneke (1914–2000), big-band saxophonist, singer, bandleader
- Ray Benson (born 1951), Western swing singer-songwriter, producer, Asleep at the Wheel
- Buster Benton (1932–1996), blues guitarist, singer
- Taz Bentley, rock drummer (Burden Brothers)
- Shelly Berg (born 1955), jazz pianist and educator
- David Berman (1967–2019), alt-rock singer-songwriter (Silver Jews)
- Big Moe (Kenneth Moore) (1974–2007), rapper
- Big Pokey (Milton Powell Jr.) (1974–2023), rapper
- Bill Smith Combo, aka Tommy & The Tom Toms, DFW rock 'n roll group
- Ryan Bingham (born 1981), country singer-songwriter
- Scott H. Biram (born 1974), blues, punk, country, heavy metal musician
- Cedric Bixler-Zavala (born 1974), dub, salsa and progressive rock musician
- Black Ace (Babe Kyro Lemon Turner) (1907–1972), blues singer, guitarist
- Clint Black (born 1962), country music singer, raised in Houston
- Robert Black (1950–1993), classical conductor, pianist, composer
- William Black (1952–2003), classical pianist, educator
- Zach Blair (born 1973), guitarist of Rise Against
- Clay Blaker (born 1950), country singer-songwriter
- William Blankenship (1928–2017), opera singer, educator
- Jules Bledsoe (1898–1943), Broadway singer
- Julien Paul Blitz (1885–1951), conductor, cellist

Bn–Bz

- Craig Bohmler (born 1956), opera/musical-theatre composer
- Zuzu Bollin (1922–1990), blues guitarist
- Juke Boy Bonner (1932–1978), blues musician
- Emanuel Borok (1944–2020), classical violinist
- Brent Bourgeois (born 1958), rock singer, producer
- Richard Bowden (born 1945), country singer-songwriter, guitarist
- Jane Bowers (1921–2000), folk singer-songwriter
- Euday L. Bowman (1887–1949), ragtime/blues pianist, composer
- Euel Box (1928–2017), music producer, composer, arranger, trumpeter
- Boxcar Willie (Lecil Travis Martin) (1931–1999), country singer
- Bill Boyd (1910–1977), country singer, guitarist
- Craig Wayne Boyd (born 1978), country singer and winner of NBC's The Voice season 7
- Calvin Boze (1916–1970), jazz/R&B trumpeter
- Danielle Bradbery (born 1996), country singer
- Jeff Bradetich (born 1957), classical double bass player and educator
- Bobby Bradford (born 1934), jazz trumpeter, cornetist, bandleader, composer
- Doyle Bramhall (1949–2011), blues singer-songwriter, drummer
- Doyle Bramhall II (born 1968), blues/rock guitarist
- Zachary Breaux (1960–1997), jazz guitarist
- David Breeden (1946–2005), classical clarinetist
- Leon Breeden (1921–2010), jazz bandleader, musician, educator
- Edie Brickell (born 1966), singer, married to Paul Simon
- Leon Bridges (born 1989), soul singer-songwriter
- Billy Briggs (born 1977), independent musician-songwriter
- Houston Bright (1916–1970), choral composer
- Ally Brooke (born 1993), pop singer
- Karen Brooks (born 1954), country singer
- Cecil Brower (1914–1965), country fiddler
- The 5 Browns (born 1979, 1980, 1983, 1984, 1986), classical pianist siblings born in Texas, raised in Texas and Utah
- Charles Brown (1922–1999), blues singer, pianist
- Clarence "Gatemouth" Brown (1924–2005), blues instrumentalist
- Jewel Brown (1937–2024), jazz/blues singer
- Lacey Brown (born 1985), folk/pop singer
- Milton Brown (1903–1936), Western swing singer, bandleader
- Rex Brown (born 1964), musician
- Cliff Bruner (1915–2000), western swing fiddler, bandleader
- Anshel Brusilow (1928–2018), orchestra conductor and violinist
- Stephen Bruton (1948–2009), country musician
- Clora Bryant (1927–2019), jazz trumpet player
- Raehann Bryce-Davis (born 1986), opera singer
- Mike Buck (born 1952), blues/rock drummer
- Betty Buckley (born 1947), actress, singer
- Teddy Buckner (1909–1994), jazz/Dixieland trumpeter
- Bun B (Bernard Freeman) (born 1973), rapper
- T-Bone Burnett (born 1948), rock/country songwriter, musician, producer
- Gerald Busby (born 1935), classical and film composer
- Johnny Bush (1935–2020), country singer-songwriter
- William Butler (born 1982), member of Arcade Fire
- Win Butler (born 1980), lead singer of Canadian indie-rock band Arcade Fire

Ca–Cm

- Ryan Cabrera (born 1982), singer-songwriter
- Ernie Caceres (1911–1971), jazz instrumentalist
- Chris Cagle (born 1968), country music artist
- Kimberly Caldwell (born 1982), pop singer, actress
- Tevin Campbell (born 1976), musician
- Tony Campise (1943–2010), jazz woodwind player
- Laura Canales (1954–2005), Tejano singer
- Leonard Candelaria (born 1947), classical/jazz trumpet player, educator
- Hayes Carll (born 1976), country singer-songwriter
- Chris Carmichael (born 1962), pop/country string instrumentalist, arranger
- Vikki Carr (born 1941), jazz, pop, country and Latin music singer
- Zachary Carrettin (born 1972), classical conductor, composer, violinist
- Georgia Carroll (1919–2011), big-band singer, actress, model
- Johnny Carroll (1937–1995), rockabilly singer, guitarist
- John Carter (1929–1991), jazz instrumentalist, composer, club owner
- Kristopher Carter (born 1972), classical and Emmy Award-winning film composer
- Cindy Cashdollar (born 1955), Western swing/bluegrass steel guitarist
- AJ Castillo (born 1986), Tejano singer
- Joyce Castle (born 1939), opera singer
- Jason Castro (born 1987), pop singer/guitarist
- Hollie Cavanagh (born 1993), pop singer
- John Cerminaro (born 1947), classical horn player
- Chamillionaire (born 1979), rapper
- Greyson Chance (born 1997), pop/rock singer, pianist
- John Barnes Chance (1932–1972), classical composer, timpanist
- Bruce Channel (born 1940), rock and roll singer
- Gary Chapman (born 1957), contemporary Christian singer-songwriter
- Mark Chesnutt (born 1963), country singer-songwriter
- Chingo Bling (Pedro Herrera III) (born 1979), rapper, producer
- Harry Choates (1922–1951), Cajun fiddler
- Charlie Christian (1916–1942), swing/jazz guitarist
- Chungha (Kim Chan-mi) (born February 9, 1996), South Korean musician
- Ciara (Ciara Harris) (born 1985), musician
- Gary Clark Jr. (born 1984), Texas blues musician
- Guy Clark (1941–2016), country singer-songwriter
- Lakrea Clark (born 1991), singer-songwriter
- Victoria Clark (born 1959), singer, Tony Award-winning actress
- Kelly Clarkson (born 1982), singer, American Idol winner
- Cynthia Clawson (born 1948), Grammy Award-winning gospel singer
- James Clay (1935–1995), jazz instrumentalist
- Sonny Clay (1899–1973), jazz pianist, drummer, bandleader
- Laura Claycomb (born 1968), operatic soprano
- Slaid Cleaves (born 1964), folk singer-songwriter
- Van Cliburn (1934–2013), pianist (born in Louisiana, raised in Texas)

Cn–Cz

- Arnett Cobb (1918–1989), jazz saxophonist
- Eddie Coker (born 1960), singer-songwriter of music for children
- Henry Coker (1919–1979), jazz trombonist
- Bongo Joe Coleman (1923–1999), jazz and street drummer
- Gary B.B. Coleman (1947–1994), soul/blues guitarist, singer-songwriter, producer
- Jerry "Bo" Coleman (born 1936), radio disc jockey; KDAV in Lubbock
- Ornette Coleman (1930–2015), jazz saxophonist
- John Ford Coley (born 1948), rock musician (England Dan & John Ford Coley)
- Bill Collings (1948–2017), guitar maker
- Albert Collins (1932–1993), blues musician
- Jim Collins (born 1956), country singer-songwriter
- Eugene Conley (1908–1981), opera singer
- Barbara Smith Conrad (1940–2017), opera singer
- David Cook (born 1982), rock singer-songwriter (born in Houston, raised in Missouri)
- Nick Cooper (born 1968), drummer, record producer, composer, filmmaker, social activist
- Paul Cooper (1926–1996), classical composer, educator
- Johnny Copeland (1937–1997), blues guitarist, singer
- Larry Coryell (1943–2017), jazz fusion guitarist
- James Cotton (1935–2017), blues harmonica player, singer-songwriter
- Josie Cotton (Kathleen Josey) (born 1956), rock singer
- Orville Couch (1935–2002), country singer-songwriter
- Cowboy Troy (born 1970), rap singer-songwriter
- Bryan-Michael Cox (born 1977), record producer, songwriter
- Cindy Cox (born 1961), classical composer
- Pee Wee Crayton (1914–1985), R&B/blues guitarist, singer
- Roger Creager (born 1971), country singer
- Dash Crofts (1940–2026), soft-rock musician (Seals and Crofts)
- Christopher Cross (born 1951), singer
- Randy Crouch (born 1952), country instrumentalist
- Wayne Crouse (1924–2000), violist
- Rodney Crowell (born 1950), country singer-songwriter
- Lella Cuberli (born 1945), opera singer
- Henry Cuesta (1931–2003), jazz/big-band clarinetist
- Jim Cullum Jr. (1941–2019), Dixieland/jazz cornetist and bandleader
- Ryan Culwell (born 1980), country/folk singer-songwriter
- Jeff Current, lead singer for Against All Will
- Mac Curtis (1939–2013), rockabilly musician
- Sonny Curtis (1937–2025), country/pop singer-songwriter

D

- Ted Daffan (1912–1996), country guitarist, songwriter
- Pappy Daily (1902–1987), country music record producer
- Floyd Dakil (1945–2010), pop guitarist-songwriter
- Vernon Dalhart (Marion Slaughter) (1883–1948), country singer-songwriter
- Chris Dave (born 1973), jazz/gospel/hip hop drummer, composer, bandleader
- Ivan Davis (1932–2018), classical pianist
- Mac Davis (1942–2020), musician
- Monte Hill Davis (1932–2018), classical pianist
- Ronnie Dawson (1939–2003), rockabilly musician
- Bobby Day (Robert James Byrd Sr.) (1928–1990), rock and roll/R&B singer-songwriter, instrumentalist, producer
- Eddie Dean (1907–1999), country singer-songwriter
- Jimmy Dean (1928–2010), country singer, television personality, businessman
- Paula DeAnda (born 1989), singer
- Bill Dees (1939–2012), country songwriter, "Oh, Pretty Woman"
- Ryan Delahoussaye (born 1976), rock instrumentalist
- Tim DeLaughter (born 1965), rock singer
- Brett Deubner (born 1968), classical violist
- Lindsay Deutsch (born 1984), classical violinist
- Al Dexter (1905–1984), country singer
- Mike Dillon, rock drummer-singer-songwriter
- Floyd Dixon (1929–2006), R&B pianist, singer
- Jessy Dixon (1938–2011), gospel singer
- DJ Screw (Robert Earl Davis Jr.) (1971–2000), hip-hop artist
- The D.O.C. (born 1968), rapper
- Deryl Dodd (born 1964), country music singer-songwriter
- Helen Donath (born 1940), operatic soprano
- Kenny Dorham (1924–1972), jazz trumpeter, singer, composer
- Bob Dorough (1923–2018), jazz vocalist, pianist, composer, songwriter, arranger, producer
- Dorrough (born 1986), rapper
- Amber Dotson (born 1973), country singer
- Bobby Doyle (1939–2006), jazz singer
- Damita Jo DuBlanc (1930–1998), lounge singer, actress, comedian
- Sherman H. Dudley (1872–1940), vaudeville and black musical performer and producer
- Hilary Duff (born 1987), singer
- Ted Dunbar (1937–1998), jazz guitarist, composer, educator
- Johnny Duncan (1938–2006), country singer
- Tommy Duncan (1911–1967), Western swing singer-songwriter
- Bob Dunn (1908–1971), jazz trombonist, Western swing steel guitarist
- Holly Dunn (1957–2016), country singer
- Ronnie Dunn (born 1953), country singer
- Chauntelle DuPree (born 1981), rock/pop guitarist (Eisley)
- Garron DuPree (born 1989), rock/pop bass guitarist (Eisley)
- Sherri DuPree (born 1983), rock/pop singer, guitarist, lyricist (Eisley)
- Stacy DuPree (born 1988), rock/pop keyboardist, singer (Eisley)
- Weston DuPree (born 1986), rock/pop drummer (Eisley)
- Eddie Durham (1906–1987), jazz guitarist, trombonist, composer, arranger

E

- Robert Ealey (1925–2001), blues singer
- Steve Earle (born 1955), singer-songwriter, musician
- Reed Easterwood (born 1967), rock guitarist
- Roger Edens (1905–1970), film composer
- Emily Elbert (born 1988), folk/soul/jazz/pop singer-songwriter
- Willard Somers Elliot (1926–2000), classical bassoonist
- Herb Ellis (1921–2010), jazz guitarist
- Merrill Leroy Ellis (1916–1981), classical composer
- Robert Ellis (born 1988), country/rock singer-songwriter
- Terry Ellis (born 1966), R&B singer (En Vogue)
- Paul Ellison (born 1941), classical bassist and teacher
- Joe Ely (1947–2025), singer-songwriter, guitarist
- Ralna English (born 1942), singer from The Lawrence Welk Show
- George Ensle (born 1948), folk/country singer-songwriter
- Roky Erickson (1947–2019), rock singer-songwriter, instrumentalist
- Booker Ervin (1930–1970), jazz saxophonist
- Alejandro Escovedo (born 1951), rock guitarist, singer-songwriter
- Dale Evans (1912–2001), country singer-songwriter, guitarist
- Herschel Evans (1909–1939), jazz saxophonist
- Roberto Eyzaguirre (1923–2004), classical pianist and teacher

F

- Terry Fator (born 1965), singer, ventriloquist, impersonator
- Fat Pat (Patrick Hawkins) (1970–1998), rapper
- Jimmy Lee Fautheree (1934–2004), rockabilly singer
- José Feghali (1961–2014), classical pianist and teacher
- Wilton Felder (1940–2015), jazz saxophonist, bassist
- Nathan Felix (born 1981), classical composer
- Freddy Fender (1937–2006), musician
- Keith Ferguson (1946–1997), blues/rock bass guitarist, The Fabulous Thunderbirds
- Rosita Fernández (1919–2006), Tejano/pop singer, actress
- Ernie Fields (c. 1904–1997), jazz trombonist
- Carl Finch (born 1951), polka musician, founder of Brave Combo
- Wilma Cozart Fine (1927–2009), classical record producer
- Charles Finger (1867–1941), music teacher, conservatory administrator; later a noted author of children's literature
- Kent Finlay (1938–2015), country singer-songwriter
- Sonny Fisher (1931–2005), rockabilly singer-songwriter, guitarist
- Rosie Flores (born 1950), country singer
- Carlisle Floyd (1926–2021), opera composer
- George Floyd (1974–2020), rapper, died in Minneapolis Police custody
- Jim Bob Floyd (born 1929), classical pianist, composer
- Blaze Foley (Michael Fuller) (1949–1989), folk singer-songwriter
- Bruce Ford (born 1956), operatic tenor
- Radney Foster (born 1959), country music singer-songwriter
- Ruthie Foster (born 1964), blues/folk singer-songwriter
- Kevin Fowler (born 1966), country singer
- Curly Fox (1910–1995), country fiddler
- James Francies (born 1995), jazz pianist, composer
- Kirk Franklin (born 1970), gospel singer
- Denny Freeman (1944–2021), blues instrumentalist, songwriter
- Eddie Freeman (1909–1987), jazz/flamenco guitarist, arranger, teacher
- Walter Fried (1877–1925), violinist and conductor
- Kinky Friedman (1944–2024), singer-songwriter, novelist, columnist, candidate for governor of Texas
- Lefty Frizzell (1928–1975), country singer
- Steven Fromholz (1945–2014), singer-songwriter
- Akiko Fujimoto, orchestra conductor
- Bobby Fuller (1942–1966), rock singer and guitarist
- Marjorie Fulton (1909–1962), classical violinist and teacher
- Anson Funderburgh (born 1954), blues guitarist, bandleader
- Justin Furstenfeld (born 1975), rock singer and guitarist

G

- Kyle Gann (born 1955), composer, musicologist, music critic
- Red Garland (1923–1984), jazz pianist
- Travis Garland (born 1989), singer-songwriter
- Joy Garrett (1945–1993), big-band singer, actress
- Henry Garza (born 1978), Los Lonely Boys lead guitarist of San Angelo, 2005 Grammy Award winner
- Jojo Garza (born 1980), Los Lonely Boys bass of San Angelo, 2005 Grammy Award winner
- Ringo Garza (born 1981), Los Lonely Boys drummer of San Angelo, 2005 Grammy Award winner
- Larry Gatlin (born 1948), singer-songwriter, member of the Gatlin Brothers
- Zelma Watson George (1903–1994), opera singer, musicologist
- Max Gerl (born 1992), jazz bass player
- Richard Giangiulio (born 1942), classical trumpet player and conductor
- Billy Gibbons (born 1949), guitarist in ZZ Top
- Mickey Gilley (1936–2022), country musician
- Don Gillis (1912–1978), composer, conductor, producer, educator
- Everett M. Gilmore (1935–2005), classical tubist
- Jimmie Dale Gilmore (born 1945), singer-songwriter
- Johnny Gimble (1926–2015), country fiddler
- John Giordano (born 1937), orchestra conductor
- Jimmy Giuffre (1921–2008), jazz composer, arranger, clarinetist and saxophonist
- Robert Glasper (born 1978), jazz pianist
- Jack Glatzer (born 1939), concert violinist
- Terry Glaze (born 1964), country/heavy-metal singer, guitarist
- Darrell Glenn (1935–1990), country singer
- Lloyd Glenn (1909–1985), R&B pianist, bandleader, arranger
- Tyree Glenn (1912–1974), big band/jazz trombonist
- Lillian Glinn (1902–1978), blues singer-songwriter
- David Gockley (born 1943), opera company administrator
- Renée Elise Goldsberry (born 1971), singer-songwriter, actress
- Tomasz Golka (born 1975), classical conductor, composer, violinist
- David Golub (1950–2000), classical pianist, conductor
- Selena Gomez (born 1992), actress and singer
- Allie Gonino (born 1990), actress and pop singer
- Dennis González (1954–2022), jazz trumpet player, educator
- Floyd Graham (1902–1974), bandleader, educator
- Larry Graham (born 1946), soul, R&B, and funk musician
- Susan Graham (born 1960), opera singer
- Donald Grantham (born 1947), classical composer and music educator
- Mitchell "Mitch" Grassi (born 1992), a cappella singer
- Shakey Graves (born 1987), Americana musician
- Conan Gray (born 1998), pop singer-songwriter
- Dobie Gray (1940–2011), soul singer-songwriter
- Jerry Gray (1915–1976), swing-era arranger and bandleader
- Pat Green (born 1972), country singer-songwriter
- Thurman Green (1940–1997), jazz trombonist
- Art Greenhaw (born 1954), Grammy Award-winning recording artist, producer, engineer
- Nanci Griffith (1953–2021), singer-songwriter
- Larry Groce (born 1948), singer-songwriter of country music, children's songs; radio host
- Dewey Groom (1918–1997), country singer
- Texas Guinan (1884–1933), western singer, actress
- David Wendel Guion (1892–1981), composer, arranger of folk tunes
- Guitar Shorty (David Kearney) (1939–2022), blues guitarist
- Woody Guthrie (1912–1967), folk singer-songwriter (spent several years in Pampa, during the formative period of his youth)
- Billy Guy (Frank Phillips Jr.) (1936–2002), R&B/rock and roll singer (The Coasters)

H–I

- Marcus Haddock (born 1957), opera singer
- Jaymee Haefner, classical harpist, teacher
- Dan Haerle (1937–2024), jazz pianist, composer, author, teacher
- Monte Hale (1919–2009), country singer, actor
- Robert Hale (1933–2023), opera singer
- Tommy Hall (born 1943), rock electric jug player
- Stuart Hamblen (1908–1989), country singer, candidate for U.S. president
- Ed Hamell, punk-rock singer-songwriter, guitarist
- Bob Hames (1920–1998), jazz guitarist
- Butch Hancock (born 1945), country/folk singer-songwriter
- Gerre Hancock (1934–2012), organist, composer
- Tommy Hancock (1929–2020), country singer, bandleader
- John Handy (born 1933), jazz saxophonist
- John Hardee (1919–1984), jazz saxophonist
- Glen Hardin (born 1939), rock and roll piano player
- Maud Cuney Hare (1874–1936), music historian, civil rights activist
- Roy Hargrove (1969–2018), jazz trumpet player
- Eric Harland (born 1976), jazz drummer
- Everette Harp (born 1961), jazz saxophonist
- Lynn Harrell (1944–2020), concert cellist raised in Texas
- Mack Harrell (1909–1960), operatic baritone
- Peppermint Harris (Harrison Nelson Jr.) (1925–1999), R&B singer, guitarist
- R. H. Harris (1916–2000), gospel singer
- Daniel Hart (born 1976), indie pop singer-songwriter, violinist
- Earl Harvin, rock drummer
- Bess Lomax Hawes (1921–2009), folk musician, folklorist
- Gibby Haynes (born 1957), lead singer of the Butthole Surfers
- Thomas Hayward (1917–1995), opera singer, teacher
- Cedric Haywood (1914–1969), jazz pianist
- Roy Head (1941–2020), Roy Head and The Traits
- Sundance Head (born 1979), country singer-songwriter, contestant from American Idol season 6 and winner of NBC's The Voice season 11
- The Reverend Horton Heat (James C. Heath) (born 1959), psychobilly singer-songwriter, guitarist
- Chet Helms (1942–2005), music promoter, called father of the Summer of Love
- Julius Hemphill (1938–1995), jazz composer, saxophonist
- Bugs Henderson (1943–2012), blues guitarist
- Tom Hendricks, rock/blues guitarist, magazine writer, editor
- Terri Hendrix (born 1968), contemporary folk singer-songwriter
- Don Henley (born 1947), musician with rock group the Eagles
- Shifty Henry (1921–1958), R&B/jazz instrumentalist, songwriter
- Walter Herbert (1898–1975), opera conductor and administrator
- Ally Brooke Hernandez (born 1993), pop singer
- Cenobio Hernandez (1863–1950), classical composer
- Anna Goodman Hertzberg (1864–1937), pianist, civic leader, philanthropist
- Casey Hess, rock guitarist (Burden Brothers)
- Carolyn Hester (born 1937), folk singer-songwriter
- Sara Hickman (born 1963), rock/pop singer-songwriter
- Johnnie High (1929–2010), country musician and impresario
- Ray Hildebrand (1940–2023), pop singer, Paul & Paula
- Dusty Hill (1945–2021), bass guitarist in ZZ Top
- Z. Z. Hill (1935–1984), blues singer
- Tish Hinojosa (born 1955), Mexican-American folk singer
- James William Hipp (born 1934), classical trumpet player, educator, music administrator
- Desmond Hoebig (born 1961), classical cellist and teacher
- Ernst Hoffmann (c. 1899–1956), orchestra conductor
- Adolph Hofner (1916–2000), western swing bandleader
- Smokey Hogg (1914–1960), country blues singer, guitarist
- Darius Holbert (born 1974), film composer, singer-songwriter
- John Holiday (born 1985), opera singer
- Jennifer Holliday (born 1960), Grammy Award-winning singer, actress
- Buddy Holly (1936–1959), singer-songwriter
- Steve Holy (born 1972), country singer
- Champ Hood (1952–2001), alternative country singer-instrumentalist
- Stix Hooper (born 1938), jazz drummer
- Sam Lightnin' Hopkins (1912–1982), blues musician
- Jazzmeia Horn (born 1991), jazz singer-songwriter
- Johnny Horton (1925–1960), country singer
- Brad Houser (1960–2023), rock instrumentalist
- Mark Houston (1946–1995), composer, lyricist, playwright, actor, newspaper columnist
- Scott Hoying (born 1991), a cappella singer
- Frank Huang (born 1978), concert violinist
- Ray Wylie Hubbard (born 1946), country singer-songwriter
- Bill Hughes (1930–2018), jazz trombonist, bandleader
- Billie Hughes (1948–1998), singer-songwriter, musician
- Joe "Guitar" Hughes (1937–2003), blues singer, guitarist
- Bobbi Humphrey (born 1950), jazz flutist
- Jerry Hunt (1943–1993), avant-garde composer
- Ivory Joe Hunter (1914–1974), R&B singer-songwriter, pianist
- Long John Hunter (1931–2016), blues guitarist, singer-songwriter
- Willie Hutch (1944–2005), blues/R&B singer-songwriter, instrumentalist, record producer
- Clarence Hutchenrider (1908–1991), jazz clarinetist
- Walter Hyatt (1949–1996), folk singer, guitarist
- Jack Ingram (born 1970), country singer-songwriter
- Dennis Irwin (1951–2008), jazz double bassist, also played clarinet and saxophone

J

- Jill Jackson (born 1942), pop singer, Paul & Paula
- Melvin Jackson (1915–1976), blues guitarist
- Ronald Shannon Jackson (1940–2013), jazz drummer
- Don Jacoby (1920–1995), trumpet player and teacher
- Illinois Jacquet (1922–2004), jazz saxophonist, bassoonist
- Russell Jacquet (1917–1990), jazz trumpeter
- Sarah Jaffe (born 1986), folk/rock singer-songwriter
- Casey James (born 1983), pop/country singer, guitarist
- Harry James (1916–1983), jazz/big band trumpeter (lived and worked in Beaumont as an adolescent)
- Sarah Jarosz (born 1991), Americana/bluegrass singer-songwriter, instrumentalist
- Blind Lemon Jefferson (1897–1929), blues musician
- Speight Jenkins (1937–2026), opera administrator, producer
- Waylon Jennings (1937–2002), country singer
- Michael Jerome (born 1967), rock drummer
- Flaco Jiménez (1939–2025), Tejano accordionist
- Santiago Jiménez Jr. (born 1961), conjunto accordionist
- Kari Jobe (born 1981), Christian singer-songwriter
- Evan Johns (1956–2017), rockabilly guitarist
- Blind Willie Johnson (1897–1945), blues/spirituals singer, guitarist
- Budd Johnson (1910–1984), jazz saxophonist
- Conrad O. Johnson (1915–2008), music educator
- David N. Johnson (1922–1987), classical organist, composer, educator
- Donald "DJ" Johnson (born 1983), rock drummer
- Eric Johnson (born 1954), rock/jazz/country guitarist
- Gus Johnson (1913–2000), jazz drummer
- Keg Johnson (1908–1967), jazz trombonist
- Money Johnson (1918–1978), jazz trumpeter
- Virgil L. Johnson (1935–2013), musician, The Velvets
- Willie Neal Johnson (1935–2001), gospel singer
- Daniel Johnston (1961–2019), rock singer-songwriter
- Nicholas Jonas (born 1992), singer, guitarist of the Jonas Brothers
- George Jones (1931–2013), country singer
- Little Hat Jones (1899–1981), blues singer, guitarist
- Maggie Jones (1894–unknown), blues singer, pianist, known as "The Texas Nightingale"
- Mike Jones (born 1981), rapper
- Norah Jones (born 1979), soul/folk singer-songwriter, born in New York City but raised in Texas
- Tom Jones (1928–2023), lyricist of musical theater
- Janis Joplin (1943–1970), blues/rock singer
- Scott Joplin (c. 1867–1917), ragtime musician and composer
- Esteban Jordan (1939–2010), conjunto/Tejano accordionist
- Jimmy Joy (1902–1962), jazz/big-band saxophonist, clarinetist

K

- Kurt Kaiser (1934–2018), church music composer
- Benjamin Kamins (born 1952), classical bassoonist
- Milton Katims (1909–2006), concert violist and conductor
- Garrett Keast (born 1971), classical conductor
- Robert Earl Keen (born 1957), singer-songwriter
- Bobby Keys (1943–2014), rock/jazz saxophonist, played with The Rolling Stones
- Peck Kelley (1898–1980), jazz pianist and bandleader
- Kristen Kelly, country singer
- Kent Kennan (1913–2003), classical composer
- King Curtis (Curtis Ousley) (1934–1971), R&B/pop saxophonist
- Freddie King (1934–1976), blues guitarist and singer
- Ralph Kirshbaum (born 1946), cellist
- Beyoncé (born 1981), R&B singer, actress
- John Knowles (born 1942), popular/classical guitarist, composer, arranger, music educator, physicist
- Solange Knowles (born 1986), R&B singer-songwriter, actress, model, dancer
- Buddy Knox (1933–1999), rockabilly singer-songwriter
- Normani Kordei (born 1996), pop singer, dancer
- Karl Korte (1928–2022), composer, music educator
- Lili Kraus (1903–1986), classical pianist
- Hans Kreissig (1857–1929), conductor, pianist, educator; created Dallas Symphony Orchestra
- Kris Kristofferson (1936–2024), singer-songwriter, actor
- Philip Krumm (born 1941), composer
- Ben Kweller (born 1981), rock singer-songwriter/instrumentalist

L

- Fredell Lack (1922–2017), concert violinist and teacher
- Eugene Lacritz (1929–2012), classical/Broadway clarinetist, saxophonist, conductor
- Jimmy LaFave (1955–2017), folk/country/rock singer-songwriter
- Gary Lakes (1950–2025), opera singer
- Alex Lambert (born 1990), pop singer-songwriter
- Miranda Lambert (born 1983), country music singer-songwriter
- Harold Land (1928–2001), bop saxophonist
- Kasey Lansdale (born 1988), country singer-songwriter
- Shelly Lares (born 1971), Tejano singer-songwriter
- Milt Larkin (1910–1996), jazz trumpeter, bandleader
- Prince Lasha (1929–2008), jazz instrumentalist
- William P. Latham (1917–2004), classical composer
- Debra Laws (born 1956), soul singer
- Eloise Laws (born 1943), jazz singer
- Hubert Laws (born 1939), jazz/classical flutist, saxophonist
- Ronnie Laws (born 1950), jazz saxophonist
- Melissa Lawson (born 1976), country singer
- Lead Belly (Huddie Ledbetter) (1888–1949), blues musician
- Paul Leary (born 1957), rock guitarist
- Johnny Lee (born 1946), country singer
- Shannon Lee (born 1992), classical violinist
- Will Lee (born 1952), jazz/rock bassist
- William Franklin Lee III (1929–2011), jazz pianist, composer, arranger, author, music educator
- Paul Leim (born 1950), country/rock/pop drummer
- Raymond Lewenthal (1923–1988), concert pianist
- Vaden Todd Lewis (born 1965), grunge singer-guitarist (the Toadies, Burden Brothers)
- Willie Lewis (1905–1971), jazz clarinetist, bandleader
- Lil Flip (Wesley Weston Jr.) (born 1981), rapper
- Mance Lipscomb (1895–1976), blues singer, guitarist
- Maggie Lindemann (born 1998), singer-songwriter
- Robert Lipsett (born 1947), concert violinist and master teacher
- Bill Lister (1923–2009), country singer
- Andrew Litton (born 1959), orchestra conductor
- Liv.e (Hailee Williams) (born 1998), neo-soul singer-songwriter, rapper
- Bob Livingston (born 1948), country singer-songwriter
- Lizzo (Melissa Jefferson) (born 1988), rapper, singer-songwriter
- Lisa Loeb (born 1968), singer-songwriter, actress
- Hannibal Lokumbe (born Marvin Peterson) (born 1948), jazz trumpet player, composer
- Alan Lomax (1915–2002), folk singer, guitarist, ethnomusicologist, folklorist
- John London (1942–2000), pop/rock guitarist, songwriter; television production crew
- Jim Long (1943–2022), music producer, publisher; entrepreneur
- Isidro López (1929–2004), Tejano bandleader
- Trini Lopez (1937–2020), Hispanic musician, singer
- Demi Lovato (born 1992), singer, actress
- Lyle Lovett (born 1957), singer-songwriter
- David Lowery (born 1960), rock guitarist, singer-songwriter
- Josephine Lucchese (1893–1974), opera singer
- LeToya Luckett (born 1981), singer
- Bob Luman (1937–1978), country/rockabilly singer
- Anne Lundy (born 1954), classical conductor, music educator
- Ray Lynch (1943–2025), classical guitarist and lutenist
- Barbara Lynn (born 1942), R&B guitarist, singer-songwriter

Ma–Mm

- Machine Gun Kelly (Colson Baker) (born 1990), rapper
- Michael Madden (born 1979), bassist for Maroon 5
- Clif Magness (born 1957), pop songwriter, producer
- Martie Maguire (born 1969), country singer-songwriter (the Dixie Chicks)
- Austin Mahone (born 1996), pop singer
- Martin Mailman (1932–2000), classical composer and educator
- Lloyd Maines (born 1951), musician, producer
- Natalie Maines (born 1974), musician
- Major (Major R. Johnson Finley) (born 1984), pop/soul singer-songwriter
- Petronel Malan (born 1974), concert pianist
- Kirstin 'Kirstie' Maldonado (born 1992), a cappella singer
- Post Malone (born 1995), rap singer-songwriter
- Barbara Mandrell (born 1948), country singer
- Louise Mandrell (born 1954), country singer
- David Mann (born 1966), gospel singer, actor
- Tamela Mann (born 1966), gospel singer, actress
- Chris Marion (born 1962), rock musician member of Little River Band
- Tina Marsh (1954–2009), jazz singer, composer
- David Martin (1937–1987) rock musician, member of Sam The Sham & The Pharaohs, Tommy & The Tom Toms
- Mary Martin (1913–1990), Broadway singer, actress
- Shaun Martin (1978–2024), jazz/gospel composer, arranger, musician
- Ana María Martínez (born 1971), opera singer
- Narciso Martínez (1911–1992), conjunto singer, accordionist
- Óscar Martínez (1934–2020), Tejano musician, songwriter
- Rhema Marvanne (born 2002), gospel singer
- Curt Massey (1910–1991), country musician
- Louise Massey (1902–1983), country singer-songwriter
- Eduardo Mata (1942–1995), orchestra conductor
- Johnny Mathis (born 1935), singer
- Johnny "Country" Mathis (1930–2011), country singer-songwriter
- Rich Matteson (1929–1993), jazz brass player, bandleader, educator
- Joe B. Mauldin (1940–2015), rock and roll bass player
- Pete Mayes (1938–2008), blues singer-songwriter, guitarist
- Sally Mayes (born 1959), Broadway singer and actress, jazz/rock singer
- Timothy McAllister (born 1972), classical saxophonist
- Leon McAuliffe (1917–1988), Western swing guitarist
- W. Francis McBeth (1933–2012), composer, music educator
- Erin McCarley (born 1979), alternative music singer-songwriter
- Delbert McClinton (born 1940), singer-songwriter, instrumentalist
- Mary McCormic (1889–1981), opera singer, educator
- Neal McCoy (born 1958), country singer
- David McEnery (1914–2002), country/Christian singer-songwriter, guitarist
- Richard McKay (born 1982), orchestra conductor
- Nikki McKibbin (1978–2020), rock singer-songwriter
- Ray McKinley (1910–1995), jazz drummer, singer, bandleader
- Eliza Jane McKissack (1828–1900), music educator and administrator, singer, pianist
- Ian McLagan (1945–2014), rock keyboardist
- Clint McLaughlin (born 1957), trumpet player and teacher, author
- Cosmé McMoon (1901–1980), classical pianist, accompanied Florence Foster Jenkins
- James McMurtry (born 1962), folk-rock singer-songwriter, son of novelist Larry McMurtry
- Joe McQueen (1919–2019), jazz saxophonist
- Cindy McTee (born 1953), classical composer
- Meat Loaf (1951–2022), singer, actor
- David Meece (born 1952), contemporary Christian singer, pianist
- William B. Meeks Jr. (1921–1999), producer, composer, arranger of radio jingles; woodwind player
- Lydia Mendoza (1916–2007), Tejano singer
- Tom Merriman (1924–2009), commercial/jazz composer, arranger, producer, bandleader, educator
- Tift Merritt (born 1975), rock/country singer-songwriter
- Augie Meyers (1940–2026), rock/Tejano keyboard player
- Louis Meyers (1955–2016), co-founder of South by Southwest music and media festival, multi-instrumentalist
- Bunny Michael, visual artist, musician, and rapper
- Aryn Michelle (born 1983), Christian pop/rock singer-songwriter
- Liz Mikel (born 1963), jazz singer, actress
- Amos Milburn (1927–1980), R&B singer, pianist
- Buddy Miles (1947–2008), rock drummer
- Frankie Miller (born 1931), country musician
- Julie Miller (born 1956), country singer-songwriter
- Rhett Miller (born 1970), alt-country singer
- Roger Miller (1936–1992), singer-songwriter
- Steve Miller (born 1943), blues/rock guitarist
- Mary Mills (born 1964), opera singer
- Mike Mitchell (born 1994), jazz drummer

Mn–Mz

- Charles Moffett (1929–1997), jazz drummer
- Bill Moffit (1926–2008), marching-band director, music arranger and composer
- Margarita Monet (born 1990), rock singer, pianist, composer, actress
- Bob Montgomery (1937–2014), rockabilly singer-songwriter, producer
- Johnny Moore (1906–1969), blues singer, guitarist
- Latonia Moore (born 1979), opera singer
- Oscar Moore (1916–1981), jazz/blues guitarist
- Tiny Moore (1920–1987), western swing instrumentalist
- Whistlin' Alex Moore (1899–1989), blues pianist, singer, whistler
- Michael Morales (born 1963), rock/pop singer-songwriter
- Jason Moran (born 1975), jazz pianist
- Mike Moreno (born 1978), jazz guitarist
- Mike Morgan (born 1959), blues guitarist, harmonica player, singer-songwriter
- Craig Morris (born 1968), classical trumpet player, educator
- Gary Morris (born 1948), country singer, actor
- Harold Morris (1890–1964), classical pianist, composer, educator
- Jay Hunter Morris (born 1963), opera singer
- Maren Morris (born 1990), country singer-songwriter
- Ella Mae Morse (1924–1999), blues/jazz/pop singer
- Mark Morton (born 1960), classical double bass player
- Lacey Mosley (born 1981), lead singer of alternative metal band Flyleaf
- Moon Mullican (1909–1967), country singer-songwriter, pianist
- Michael Martin Murphey (born 1945), country singer-songwriter
- Kacey Musgraves (born 1988), country singer-songwriter
- Mason Musso (born 1989), pop/rock singer-songwriter
- Sam Myers (1936–2006), blues singer, instrumentalist

N–O

- Johnny Nash (1940–2020), pop singer-songwriter
- Emilio Navaira (1962–2016), Latin pop/country musician
- Sam Neely (1948–2006), country singer, guitarist
- Nelly (real name Cornell Haynes) (born 1974), rapper, singer-songwriter, entrepreneur, investor, and occasional actor
- Jimmy Nelson (1928–2007), blues singer-songwriter
- Steady Nelson (1913–1988), jazz/swing trumpeter
- Willie Nelson (born 1933), country singer-songwriter
- Michael Nesmith (1942–2021), singer with The Monkees
- Mickey Newbury (1940–2002), country/folk singer-songwriter
- David "Fathead" Newman (1933–2009), jazz saxophonist
- Johnny Nicholas (born 1948), blues singer, pianist
- Elena Nikolaidi (1909–2002), opera singer and teacher
- John Nitzinger (born 1948), rock guitarist, songwriter
- Kevin Noe (born 1969), classical conductor
- Timothy Nolen (1941–2023), opera singer, Broadway singer and actor
- Normani (born 1996), pop singer
- Daron Norwood (1965–2015), country singer
- Salim Nourallah (born 1967), alt-country singer-songwriter
- Darrell Nulisch (born 1952), blues singer
- Gary P. Nunn (born 1945), country singer-songwriter
- Laura Lee Ochoa (born 1986), rock guitarist, singer-songwriter
- Phil Ochs (1940–1976), folk singer-songwriter
- W. Lee "Pappy" O'Daniel (1890–1969), country-western singer-songwriter, Texas governor, and U.S. senator
- Adolfo Odnoposoff (1917–1992), classical cellist and teacher
- O.G. Style (Eric Woods) (1970–2008), rapper
- Paul Olefsky (1926–2013), classical cellist and teacher
- Pauline Oliveros (1932–2016), avant-garde composer, performance artist
- Gene O'Quin (1932–1978), country singer
- Wayne Oquin (born 1977), classical composer, music educator
- Roy Orbison (1936–1988), singer-songwriter
- K. T. Oslin (1941–2020), country singer-songwriter
- Tommy Overstreet (1937–2015), country singer
- Buck Owens (1929–2006), country singer
- Ephraim Owens (born 1972), jazz trumpeter, composer
- John Owings (born 1943), classical pianist

P–Q

- Hot Lips Page (1908–1954), jazz trumpeter, bandleader
- Kaitee Page (born 1985), electropop singer, multi-instrumentalist formerly known as Lunic
- Knocky Parker (1918–1986), country/jazz pianist
- Steve Parker, musician, composer, artist
- Dean Parks (born 1946), studio musician
- Vinnie Paul (Abbott) (1964–2018), rock drummer, producer
- Glen Payne (1926–1999), gospel singer
- Leon Payne (1917–1969), country singer-songwriter
- Maurice Peress (1930–2017), classical conductor, educator
- Paul Peress (born 1959), jazz/world music drummer, composer, producer
- Chris Pérez (born 1969), rock guitarist, singer-songwriter
- Jay Perez (born 1963), Tejano singer-songwriter
- Jack Petersen (born 1933), jazz guitarist, educator
- Ray Peterson (1939–2005), pop singer
- Esther Phillips (1935–1984), R&B/jazz/pop/country singer
- Washington Phillips (1880–1954), gospel singer, instrumentalist
- Buster Pickens (1916–1964), blues pianist
- Patrice Pike (born 1970), rock/soul singer-songwriter-guitarist
- Ben J. Pierce (born 1999), YouTuber, singer-songwriter, actor
- Pimp C (Chad Butler) (1973–2007), rapper
- Mark Pirro (born 1970), rock bass player
- Harvey Pittel (born 1943), classical saxophonist
- Shawn Pittman (born 1974), blues rock singer-songwriter
- Howard Pollack (born 1952), classical pianist, musicologist, author, professor
- Joe Poovey (1941–1998), rockabilly singer-songwriter
- The Powell Brothers (Taylor Powell and Blake Powell), country musicians
- Billy Preston (1946–2006), soul musician
- Johnny Preston (1939–2011), pop singer
- Ray Price (1926–2013), country singer
- Sammy Price (1908–1992), jazz/blues pianist, bandleader
- Toni Price (1961–2024), country/blues singer
- Charley Pride (1938–2020), country singer
- P. J. Proby (born 1938), singer-songwriter, actor
- Bobby Pulido (born 1973), Tejano musician, politician
- Roberto Pulido (born 1950), Tejano musician
- Chris Purdy (born 1972), pop/rock singer-songwriter
- Wynne Pyle (1881–1971), classical pianist
- Queen Ida (Ida Lewis Guillory) (born 1929), Creole/zydeco accordionist
- Abraham Quintanilla (1939–2025), Tejano singer-songwriter, producer

R

- Ezra Rachlin (1915–1995), orchestra conductor, pianist
- RaeLynn (Racheal Lynn Woodward) (born 1994), country singer
- Gene Ramey (1913–1984), jazz double bassist
- Richard Ramirez, noise musician
- Willis Alan Ramsey (born 1951), country singer-songwriter
- Jon Randall (born 1969), country singer-songwriter
- Mickey Raphael (born 1951), country/rock harmonica player
- Leon Rausch (1927–2019), Western swing singer
- Tha Realest (Jevon Jones) (born 1974), rapper
- Marc Rebillet (born 1988), funk/hip-hop electronic musician
- Jaret Reddick (born 1972), punk singer-songwriter, guitarist, Bowling for Soup
- Dewey Redman (1931–2006), jazz saxophonist
- Goebel Reeves (1899–1959), folk singer
- Jim Reeves (1923–1964), country/pop singer-songwriter
- Claire Raphael Reis (1888–1978), classical music promoter, musicologist, educator
- Max Reiter (1905–1950), classical orchestra conductor
- Nicola Rescigno (1916–2008), opera conductor
- Timothy Rhea (born 1967), conductor, music educator
- Sonny Rhodes (born Clarence Edward Smith) (1940–2021), blues singer, guitar player
- John Rich (born 1974), country music singer-songwriter
- J. P. (The Big Bopper) Richardson (1930–1959), rock-and-roll/country singer
- Jim Riggs (born 1941), saxophonist, educator
- Jeannie C. Riley (born 1945), country singer
- LeAnn Rimes (born 1982), country singer; born in Mississippi, but grew up in Garland
- Cowboy Slim Rinehart (1911–1948), country singer
- Tex Ritter (1905–1974), singer/ actor, father of actor John Ritter
- LaTavia Roberson (born 1981), singer
- Eck Robertson (1887–1975), country fiddler
- Don Robey (1903–1975), blues songwriter, record producer
- Hal Robinson (born 1952), classical string bass player
- Sharon Robinson (born 1949), classical cellist
- Bruce Robison (born 1966), country singer-songwriter
- Charlie Robison (1964–2023), country singer-songwriter
- Jimmie Rodgers (1897–1933), country singer
- Carrie Rodriguez (born 1978), folk singer-songwriter, fiddler
- Danny Rodriguez (1967–1990), Christian rapper
- David Rodriguez (1952–2015), folk singer-songwriter
- Johnny Rodriguez (1951–2025), country singer
- Omar Rodríguez-López (born 1975), Dub and Progressive rock musician
- Robert Xavier Rodríguez (born 1946), classical composer
- Herbert Rogers (1929–1983), classical pianist and teacher
- Kenny Rogers (1938–2020), country singer-songwriter
- Randy Rogers, country singer
- Gene Roland (1921–1982), jazz composer, musician
- A. Clyde Roller (1914–2005), conductor and music educator
- Moreland Kortkamp Roller (1916–2006), classical pianist and teacher
- Lulu Roman (1947–2025), country/gospel singer, comedian
- Beatrice Schroeder Rose (1922–2014), classical harpist
- Kelly Rowland (born 1981), R&B singer-songwriter, dancer, actress
- Nancy Rumbel (born 1951), classical/new-age oboist, ocarina player, won Grammy Award
- Tim Rushlow (born 1966), country musician
- Mike Ryan (born 1988), country singer-songwriter, guitarist

Sa–Sm

- Doug Sahm (1941–1999), Tejano musician-songwriter
- Carl St.Clair (born 1952), orchestra conductor
- Sandra St. Victor (born 1963), R&B/soul/jazz singer-songwriter
- St. Vincent (Annie Clark) (born 1982), pop singer-songwriter, instrumentalist
- Olga Samaroff (1880–1948), classical pianist and teacher
- Joe Sample (1939–2014), jazz pianist, composer
- Domingo "Sam" Samudio (born 1937), rock 'n' roll musician, bandleader, entertainer ("Sam the Sham")
- George Sanger (born 1957), video-game music composer
- Stephanie Sant'Ambrogio (born 1960), violinist
- Simon Sargon (1938–2022), classical composer, pianist, conductor
- Ray Sasaki (born 1948), trumpet player, educator
- Leslie Satcher (born 1962), country and bluegrass singer
- Billy Jack Saucier (1931–1987), country fiddler
- Boz Scaggs (born 1944), singer-songwriter
- Tony Scalzo (born 1964), pop/rock singer-songwriter, guitarist
- Scarface (born 1970), rapper
- Haley Scarnato (born 1982), American Idol (season 6) finalist (8th place)
- Harvey Schmidt (1929–2018), musical theatre composer (The Fantasticks)
- Eduard Schmieder (born 1948), classical violinist, teacher
- David Schnaufer (1952–2006), folk dulcimer player, music educator
- Emil Schuhmann (1856–1937), accordionist, bandleader, folk artist
- Jerry Scoggins (1911–2004), country singer
- Kendrick Scott (born 1980), jazz drummer, bandleader, composer
- Travis Scott (Jacques Webster Jr.) (born 1992), hip hop recording artist, music producer
- Joe Scruggs (born 1951), retired children's and folk singer-songwriter
- Dan Seals (1948–2009), rock/country musician (England Dan & John Ford Coley)
- Jim Seals (1941–2022), soft-rock musician (Seals and Crofts)
- Lynn Seaton (born 1957), jazz bassist, educator
- Selena (Selena Quintanilla) (1971–1995), Tejano/pop singer
- Jason Sellers (born 1971), country singer-songwriter
- Arban Severin (born 1976), composer of electronic music, film scores; producer
- Charlie Sexton (born 1968), rock guitarist, singer-songwriter
- Peter Seymour (born 1977), jazz/classical double bassist
- Allen Shamblin (born 1959), country songwriter
- Ray Sharpe (born 1938), rockabilly singer-songwriter, guitarist
- Billy Joe Shaver (1939–2020), country singer-songwriter
- Robert Shaw (1908–1985), blues pianist
- Bobby Lynn Shehorn (born 1950), blues singer-songwriter
- Bob (1909–1983), Joe (1911–1980), and Merle Shelton (1917–1982), country musicians, The Shelton Brothers
- Chad Shelton (born 1971), opera singer
- Harry Sheppard (1928–2022), jazz vibraphonist
- John Sheridan (1946–2021), jazz pianist
- Amanda Shires (born 1982), country singer-songwriter, fiddler
- Michelle Shocked (born 1962), singer-songwriter, musician
- Jade Simmons (born 1977), classical pianist; was also Miss Illinois
- Ashlee Simpson (born 1984), singer
- Jessica Simpson (born 1980), singer
- Frankie Lee Sims (1917–1970), blues singer-songwriter, guitarist
- Lori Singer (born 1957), classical cellist (better known as actress)
- Thomas Sleeper (1956–2022), classical composer, conductor
- Slim Thug (born 1980), rapper
- Brinton Averil Smith (born 1969), classical cellist
- Buster Smith (1904–1991), jazz saxophonist
- Chris "Frenchie" Smith, pop/rock record producer, guitarist, songwriter
- Elliott Smith (1969–2003), rock singer-songwriter
- Granger Smith (born 1979), country singer-songwriter
- Julia Smith (1905–1989), composer, pianist, author
- Ruby Jane Smith (born 1994), bluegrass fiddler, singer-songwriter
- Tim Smith, rock instrumentalist
- Walter Smith III (born 1980), jazz saxophonist, composer

Sn–Sz

- Doak Snead (1949–2020), singer-songwriter
- Johnny Solinger (1965–2021), rock singer
- Ed Soph (born 1945), jazz drummer, educator
- JD Souther (1945–2024), country/rock singer-songwriter, instrumentalist
- Billie Jo Spears (1937–2011), country singer
- Mark Speer (born 1979), rock guitarist
- Victoria Spivey (1906–1976), blues singer-songwriter
- SPM (Carlos Coy) (born 1970), Chicano rapper
- Al Staehely (born 1945), rock singer-songwriter, entertainment industry lawyer
- Terry Stafford (1941–1996), country/pop singer-songwriter
- Megan Thee Stallion (born 1995), rapper
- Kay Starr (1922–2016), pop/jazz singer
- Red Steagall (born 1938), country singer-songwriter, actor
- Lanny Steele (1933–1994), jazz pianist, music educator, composer, jazz festival promoter
- Daniel Sternberg (1913–2000), classical conductor, composer, educator
- B. W. Stevenson (1949–1998), country/pop singer-songwriter
- Stephen Stills (born 1945), singer-songwriter
- Sly Stone (Sylvester Stewart) (1943–2025), soul/funk singer-songwriter (Sly and the Family Stone)
- George Strait (born 1952), country singer
- Emily Strayer (born 1972), country singer-songwriter (The Dixie Chicks)
- Al Stricklin (1908–1986), jazz/Western swing pianist
- Nikki Stringfield (born 1990), guitarist for The Iron Maidens and Before the Mourning
- Billy Stritch (born 1962), jazz composer, arranger, pianist
- Steven Stucky (1949–2016), Pulitzer Prize-winning classical composer
- Lacey Nicole Sturm (born 1981), Alternative metal, Post-grunge, Hard rock Flyleaf
- Deanna Summers (1940–2017), songwriter, born in Mississippi
- Gene Summers (1939–2021), rock 'n roll singer ("School of Rock 'n Roll", "Big Blue Diamonds")
- DJ Sun (born 1966), record producer, DJ
- Helen Sung (born 1970), jazz pianist
- Doug Supernaw (1960–2020), country singer-songwriter
- Jeffrey Swann (born 1951), classical pianist
- Sunny Sweeney (born 1976), country music singer

T–V

- Horace Tapscott (1934–1999), jazz pianist, composer
- Buddy Tate (1913–2001), jazz saxophonist
- Johnnie Taylor (1937–2000), soul/pop singer, DJ
- Teresa Taylor (1962–2023), rock drummer
- Tommy Taylor (born 1957), rock musician
- Will Taylor (born 1968), jazz/rock/pop/country violist, violinist, arranger, composer, producer, guitarist
- Charlie Teagarden (1913–1984), jazz trumpeter
- Jack Teagarden (1905–1964), jazz trombonist and bandleader
- Norma Teagarden (1911–1996), jazz pianist
- Alfred Teltschik (1918–2009), classical pianist and teacher
- Owen Temple (born 1976), folk/country singer-songwriter, instrumentalist
- Joe Tex (Joseph Arrington Jr.) (1935–1982), soul singer-songwriter
- Texas Ruby (Ruby Owens) (1908–1963), country singer
- That Mexican OT, rapper
- Christopher Theofanidis (born 1967), classical composer
- B. J. Thomas (1942–2021), country singer-songwriter
- George W. Thomas (1885 – c. 1930), jazz pianist, songwriter
- Henry Thomas (1874 – c. 1950), blues/ragtime singer-songwriter
- Hersal Thomas (1906–1926), blues pianist, composer
- Benny Thomasson (1909–1984), country fiddler
- Hank Thompson (1925–2007), country singer-songwriter
- William Ennis Thomson (1927–2019), music educator
- Big Mama Thornton (1926–1984), R&B singer-songwriter
- Frank Ticheli (born 1958), classical composer
- Neal Tiemann (born 1982), David Cook's rock band guitarist
- Floyd Tillman (1914–2003), country guitarist, singer
- Martha Tilton (1915–2006), swing/pop singer
- Albert Tipton (1917–1997), classical flutist
- Louise Tobin (1918–2022), jazz singer
- Matt Tolentino (born 1985), musician specializing in pre-swing music
- Chris Tomlin (born 1972), singer-songwriter
- Tommy & The Tom Toms, aka Bill Smith Combo, DFW rock 'n roll group
- Tone (Tony Chung) (born 1983), pop guitarist (Cool Silly)
- Mitchell Torok (1929–2017), country singer-songwriter
- Patsy Torres (born 1957), Tejano singer
- Don Tosti (1923–2004), Latin, R&B, swing, jazz, classical bassist, pianist
- Alphonse Trent (1902–1959), jazz pianist, bandleader
- Michael Trimble (born 1938), opera singer, teacher
- Robyn Troup (born 1988), R&B/pop/soul singer
- Bion Tsang (born 1967), classical cellist, teacher
- Ernest Tubb (1914–1984), country singer-songwriter
- Justin Tubb (1935–1998), country singer-songwriter
- Tanya Tucker (born 1958), country singer
- Fisher Tull (1934–1994), composer and educator
- "Blue" Gene Tyranny (1945–2020), avant-garde composer
- Steve Tyrell (born 1944), pop singer, music producer
- Alexander Uninsky (1910–1972), concert pianist and teacher
- Tim Urban (born 1989), pop singer
- Usher (Usher Raymond IV) (born 1978), R&B and pop singer
- Mary Jeanne van Appledorn (1927–2014), composer and educator
- Frank Van der Stucken (1858–1929), conductor, composer; founder of Cincinnati Symphony Orchestra
- Vanilla Ice (born 1968), rapper
- Paul van Katwijk (1885–1974), pianist, conductor, composer, educator
- Viola Van Katwijk (1894–1980), pianist, composer, educator
- Townes Van Zandt (1944–1997), country singer-songwriter
- Jimmie Vaughan (born 1951), blues/rock guitarist, singer
- Stevie Ray Vaughan (1954–1990), musician
- Jaci Velasquez (born 1979), Contemporary Christian Latin pop singer
- Carl Venth (1860–1938), composer, conductor, violinist, music educator
- Vladimir Viardo (born 1949), classical pianist and teacher
- Rita Vidaurri (1924–2019), Tejana singer
- Tiffany Villarreal, R&B and hip hop singer
- Eddie Vinson (1917–1988), blues saxophonist
- Emmett Vokes (1928–2019), classical pianist and teacher

W–Z

- Mel Waiters (1956–2015), southern soul singer
- Billy Walker (1929–2006), country singer-songwriter
- Charlie Walker (1926–2008), country singer-songwriter
- Chris Walker, R&B/jazz singer, bass guitarist
- Cindy Walker (1918–2006), country singer-songwriter
- Django Walker (born 1981), country/rock singer-songwriter
- Esther Walker (1894–1943), blues singer, musical comedy actress
- Jerry Jeff Walker (1942–2020), country singer-songwriter
- T-Bone Walker (1910–1975), blues musician
- William Walker (1931–2010), opera singer
- Paul Wall (born 1980), rapper
- Jimbo Wallace, psychobilly/rockabilly bass player
- Sippie Wallace (1898–1986), blues singer-songwriter
- Don Walser (1934–2006), country singer, guitarist
- Cedar Walton (1934–2013), jazz pianist
- Mercy Dee Walton (1915–1962), blues pianist, singer-songwriter
- Jonathan Ware (born 1984), classical pianist
- Chris Waters, country singer-songwriter
- Doc Watkins (born 1981), jazz pianist, bandleader
- Dale Watson (born 1962), country singer
- Gene Watson (born 1943), country singer
- Johnny "Guitar" Watson (1935–1996), blues guitarist, singer
- WC (born 1970), rapper from Westside Connection
- Katie Webster (1936–1999), blues pianist
- Julius Weiss (c. 1841–19??), music professor, mentor to Scott Joplin
- Michael Weiss (born 1958), jazz composer and pianist
- Dan Welcher (born 1948), composer, music educator, bassoonist
- Emily Wells (born 1981), hip-hop/classical violinist
- Sonny West (1937–2022), rock and roll/rockabilly songwriter, musician
- James Westfall (born 1981), jazz vibraphonist, keytarist
- William Westney (born 1947), classical pianist, teacher
- Barry White (1944–2003), soul singer and record producer
- J. White Did It (born 1984), hip hop record producer, songwriter, and DJ
- Michael White (1933–2016), jazz violinist
- Chris Whitley (1960–2005), blues singer-songwriter, guitarist
- Buddy Whittington (born 1956), blues/rock guitarist
- Mike Wiebe, musician (The Riverboat Gamblers), actor, and stand-up comedian
- Rusty Wier (1944–2009), country/folk singer-songwriter
- Marijohn Wilkin (1920–2006), country songwriter
- Slim Willet (Winston Moore) (1919–1966), country singer-songwriter, DJ
- Willie D (William Dennis) (born 1966), rapper
- Clifton Williams (1923–1976), composer, educator
- Dave Williams (1972–2002), rock singer
- Don Williams (1939–2017), country singer-songwriter
- Lew Williams (1934–2019), rockabilly singer-songwriter
- Otis Williams (born 1941), singer with The Temptations
- Richard Williams (1931–1985), jazz trumpeter
- Roosevelt Williams (1903–1996), blues pianist
- Zane Williams (born 1977), country singer-songwriter
- Bob Wills (1905–1975), country singer with The Texas Playboys
- Johnnie Lee Wills (1912–1984), Western swing fiddler
- Dooley Wilson (1886 or 1894–1953), blues/jazz pianist, bandleader; actor
- Hop Wilson (1927–1975), blues steel guitarist
- J. Frank Wilson (1941–1991), pop singer, J. Frank Wilson and the Cavaliers
- Kim Wilson (born 1951), blues singer, harmonica player, The Fabulous Thunderbirds
- Teddy Wilson (1912–1986), jazz pianist
- U.P. Wilson (1934–2004), blues guitarist, singer
- Edgar Winter (born 1946), jazz/blues/rock musician
- Johnny Winter (1944–2014), blues guitarist
- Jonathan M. Wolfert (born 1952), composer, producer of radio jingles
- Lee Ann Womack (born 1966), country singer-songwriter
- Darren Keith Woods (born 1958), opera company director, singer
- Margaret Jane Wray (1962–2025), opera singer
- Bernard Wright (1963–2022), funk/jazz keyboardist, singer
- Lammar Wright Sr. (1907–1973), jazz trumpeter
- Leo Wright (1933–1991), jazz instrumentalist
- Roger Wright (born 1974), classical pianist
- Jimmy Wyble (1922–2010), jazz/swing guitarist
- Charles Yang (born 1988), classical violinist
- Cindy Yen (born 1986), pop singer-songwriter
- Sydney Youngblood (born 1960), dance/funk singer
- Camille Zamora (born 1970), classical singer
- Nancy Zhou (born 1993), classical violinist
- Jessica Zhu (born 1986), classical pianist

=== Beauty pageant winners ===
- Erica Andrews (1969–2013), drag performer, beauty queen
- Averie Bishop (born 1996), Miss Texas 2022, first Asian-American winner; businessperson, activist, actress
- Shirley Cothran (born 1955), Miss America 1975
- Candice Crawford (born 1986), beauty queen, winner of Miss Missouri USA, competed in the Miss Texas Teen USA pageant and the Miss USA pageant
- Brooke Daniels (born 1986), Miss Texas USA 2009
- Jo-Carroll Dennison (1923–2021), Miss America 1942
- Danielle Doty (born 1993), Miss Teen USA 2011
- Alyssa Edwards (Justin Johnson) (born 1980), drag performer, Miss Gay USofA 2006, Miss Gay America 2010
- Magen Ellis (born 1986), Miss Texas USA, Miss Texas Teen USA
- Christy Fichtner (born 1962), Miss USA 1986
- R'Bonney Gabriel (born 1994), Miss USA 2022 and Miss Universe 2022
- Phyllis George (1949–2020), Miss America 1971
- Courtney Gibbs (born 1966), Miss USA 1988
- Kandace Krueger (born 1976), Miss USA 2001
- Debra Maffett (born 1956), Miss America 1983
- Melissa Marse (born 1974), Texas' Junior Miss 1991, concert pianist
- Laura Martinez-Harring (born 1964), Miss USA 1985
- Asia O'Hara (born 1982), drag performer, Miss Gay America 2016
- Gretchen Polhemus (born 1965), Miss USA 1989
- Michelle Royer (born 1966), Miss USA 1987
- Jade Simmons (born 1977), classical pianist; was also Miss Illinois
- Chelsi Smith (1973–2018), Miss USA 1995 and Miss Universe 1995
- Candice Stewart (born 1984), Miss American Teen, Miss Louisiana Teen USA, Miss Louisiana USA
- Crystle Stewart (born 1981), Miss USA 2008
- Linda Stouffer (born 1970), Texas' Junior Miss 1988, television journalist
- Kimberly Tomes (born 1956), Miss USA 1977
- Paola Turbay (born 1970), Miss Colombia, first runner-up for Miss Universe, model, actress
- Christie Lee Woods (born 1977), Miss Teen USA 1996
- Cindy Yen (born 1986), Miss Chinatown USA 2009

=== Other ===
- Amouranth (Kaitlyn Michelle Siragusa) (born 1993), female model, streamer and Internet celebrity
- Asmongold (Zachariah Hoyt) (born 1990), YouTuber, content creator, streamer and political commentator
- Barbette (Vander Clyde Broadway) (1899–1973), female impersonator, aerialist
- Eva Clark, circus performer (died 1906)
- Laganja Estranja (Jay Jackson) (born 1988), drag queen, choreographer
- Eric July (born 1990), rap-metal vocalist, political commentator, comic book writer

== Sportspeople ==
=== Baseball ===
A–F

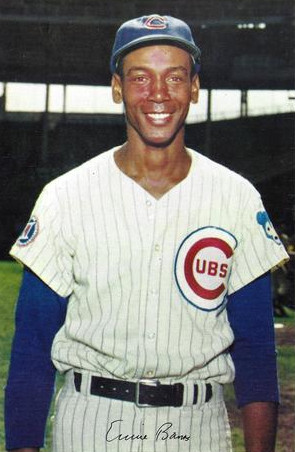
Ernie Banks

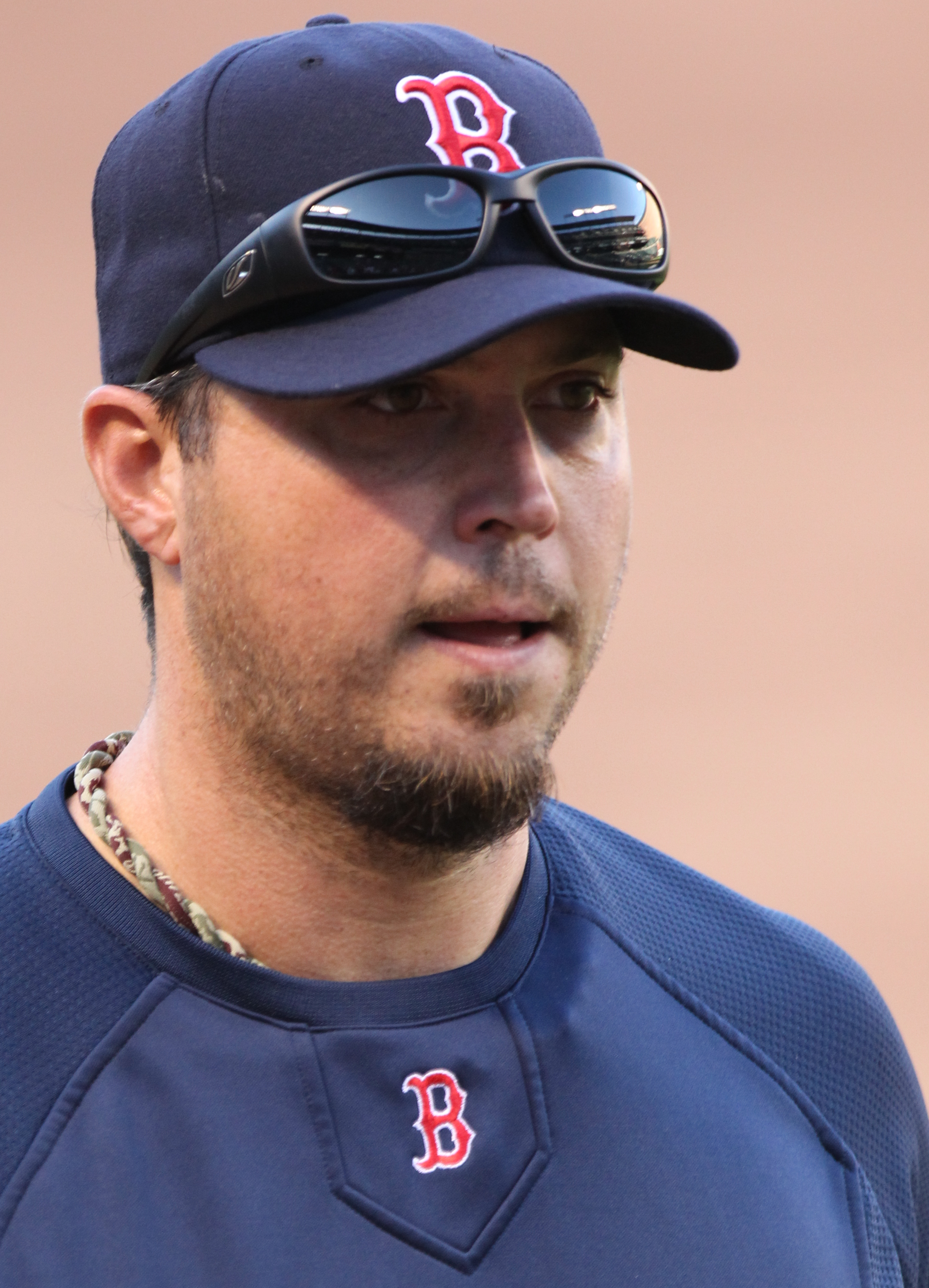
Josh Beckett

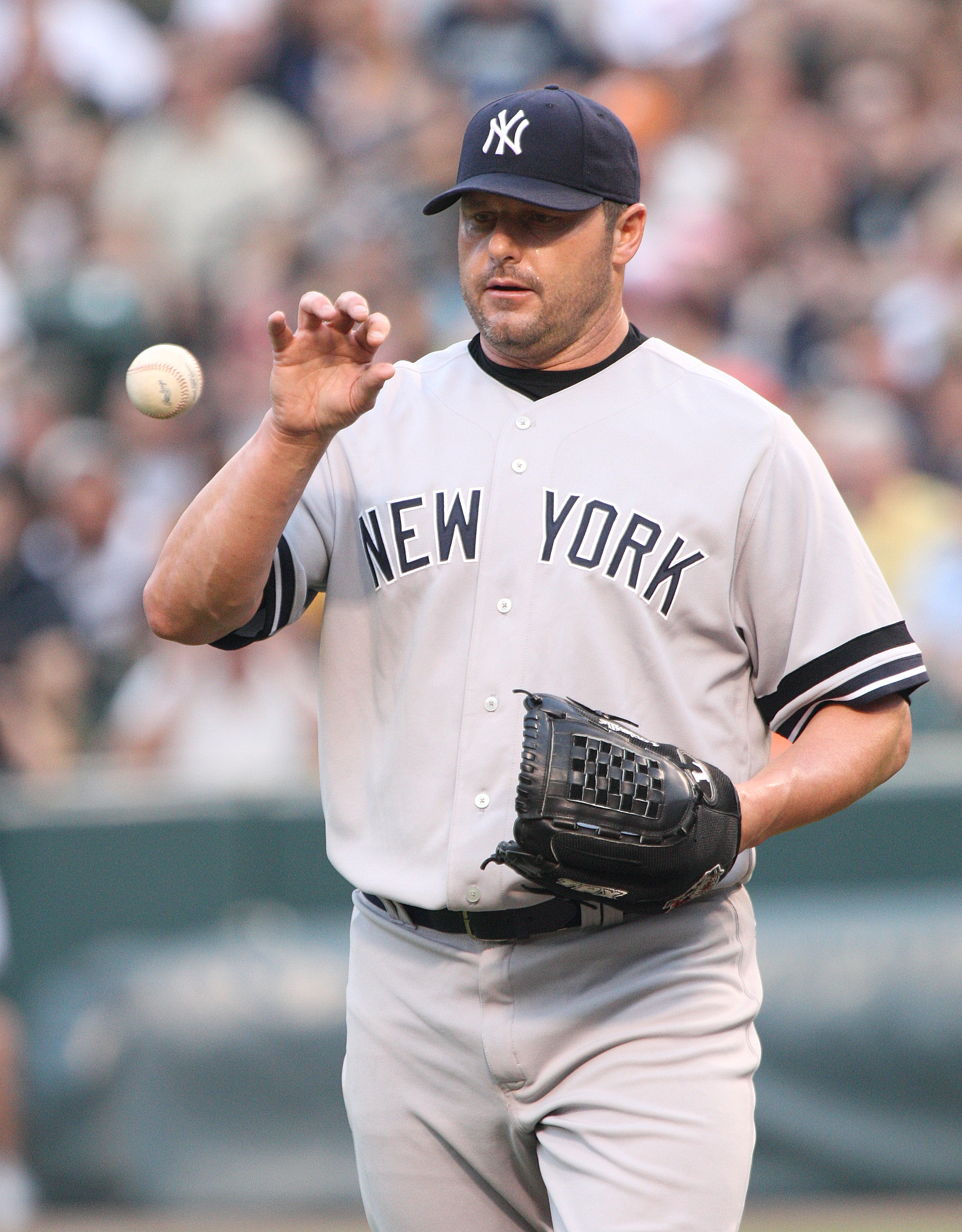
Roger Clemens

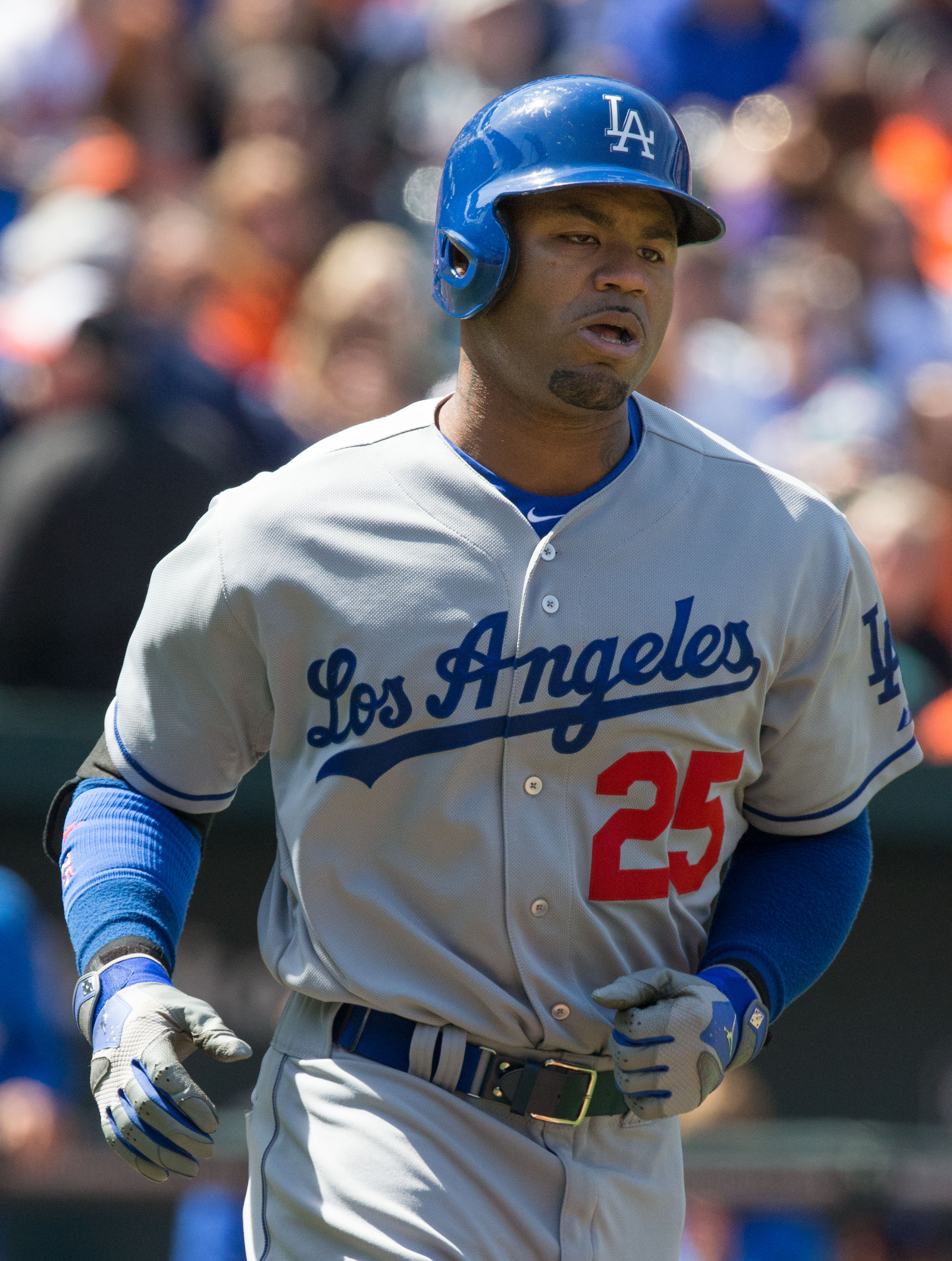
Carl Crawford

- Matt Albers (born 1983), relief pitcher for the Chicago White Sox
- Brandon Allen (born 1986), infielder for the Tampa Bay Rays
- Brett Anderson (born 1988), starting pitcher for the Colorado Rockies
- Jake Arrieta (born 1986), starting pitcher for the Chicago Cubs
- Scott Atchison (born 1976), relief pitcher for the Boston Red Sox
- Homer Bailey (born 1986), starting pitcher for the Cincinnati Reds
- Anthony Banda (born 1993), starting pitcher for the Arizona Diamondbacks
- Jeff Banister (born 1964), former catcher for the Pittsburgh Pirates, former manager for the Texas Rangers
- Ernie Banks (1931–2015), Baseball Hall of Famer
- Daniel Bard (born 1985), relief pitcher for the Boston Red Sox
- Blake Beavan (born 1989), starting pitcher for the Seattle Mariners
- Chad Beck (born 1985), relief pitcher for the Toronto Blue Jays
- Josh Beckett (born 1980), baseball, Los Angeles Dodgers, pitcher, MVP of the 2003 World Series
- Lance Berkman (born 1976), first baseman and outfielder
- Michael Bourn (born 1982), center fielder for the Atlanta Braves
- Drake Britton (born 1989), relief pitcher for the Boston Red Sox
- Zach Britton (born 1987), relief pitcher for the New York Yankees
- Jay Bruce (born 1987), outfielder for the Philadelphia Phillies
- Clay Buchholz (born 1984), baseball, Arizona Diamondbacks, pitcher, threw a no hitter in just his second MLB start
- Jorge Cantú (born 1982), infielder for the San Diego Padres
- Matt Carpenter (born 1985), infielder for the St. Louis Cardinals
- Norm Cash (1934–1986), MLB first baseman, primarily for the Detroit Tigers
- Andrew Cashner (born 1986), starting pitcher for the Texas Rangers
- Randy Choate (born 1975), relief pitcher for the St. Louis Cardinals
- Preston Claiborne (born 1988), relief pitcher for the New York Yankees
- Roger Clemens (born 1962), baseball pitcher, seven-time Cy Young Award winner
- Andy Cohen (1904–1988), baseball second baseman and coach
- Clay Condrey (born 1975), relief pitcher for the Minnesota Twins
- Carl Crawford (born 1981), outfielder for the Los Angeles Dodgers
- John Danks (born 1985), starting pitcher for the Chicago White Sox
- Chris Davis (born 1986), first baseman for the Baltimore Orioles
- Sam Demel (born 1985), relief pitcher for the Arizona Diamondbacks
- Doug Drabek (born 1962), former Cy Young-winning MLB pitcher
- Kyle Drabek (born 1987), relief pitcher for the Toronto Blue Jays
- Justin Duchscherer (born 1977), starting pitcher for the Baltimore Orioles
- Dave Duncan (born 1945), pitching coach for the St. Louis Cardinals
- Adam Dunn (born 1979), All-Star player for the Chicago White Sox
- Tyler Duffey (born 1990), relief pitcher for the Minnesota Twins
- Zach Duke (born 1983), relief pitcher for the St. Louis Cardinals
- Jon Edwards (born 1988), relief pitcher for the San Diego Padres
- Nathan Eovaldi (born 1990), starting pitcher for the Texas Rangers
- Taylor Featherston (born 1989), infielder for the Los Angeles Angels
- Brandon Finnegan (born 1993), relief pitcher for the Cincinnati Reds
- Bill Foster (1904–1978), Baseball Hall of Fame pitcher
- Steve Foster (born 1966), bullpen coach for the Kansas City Royals
- Sam Freeman (born 1987), relief pitcher for the Atlanta Braves
- David Freese (born 1983), third baseman for the Los Angeles Dodgers

G–M

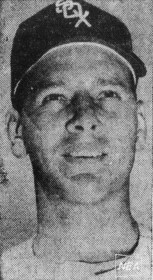
Joe Horlen

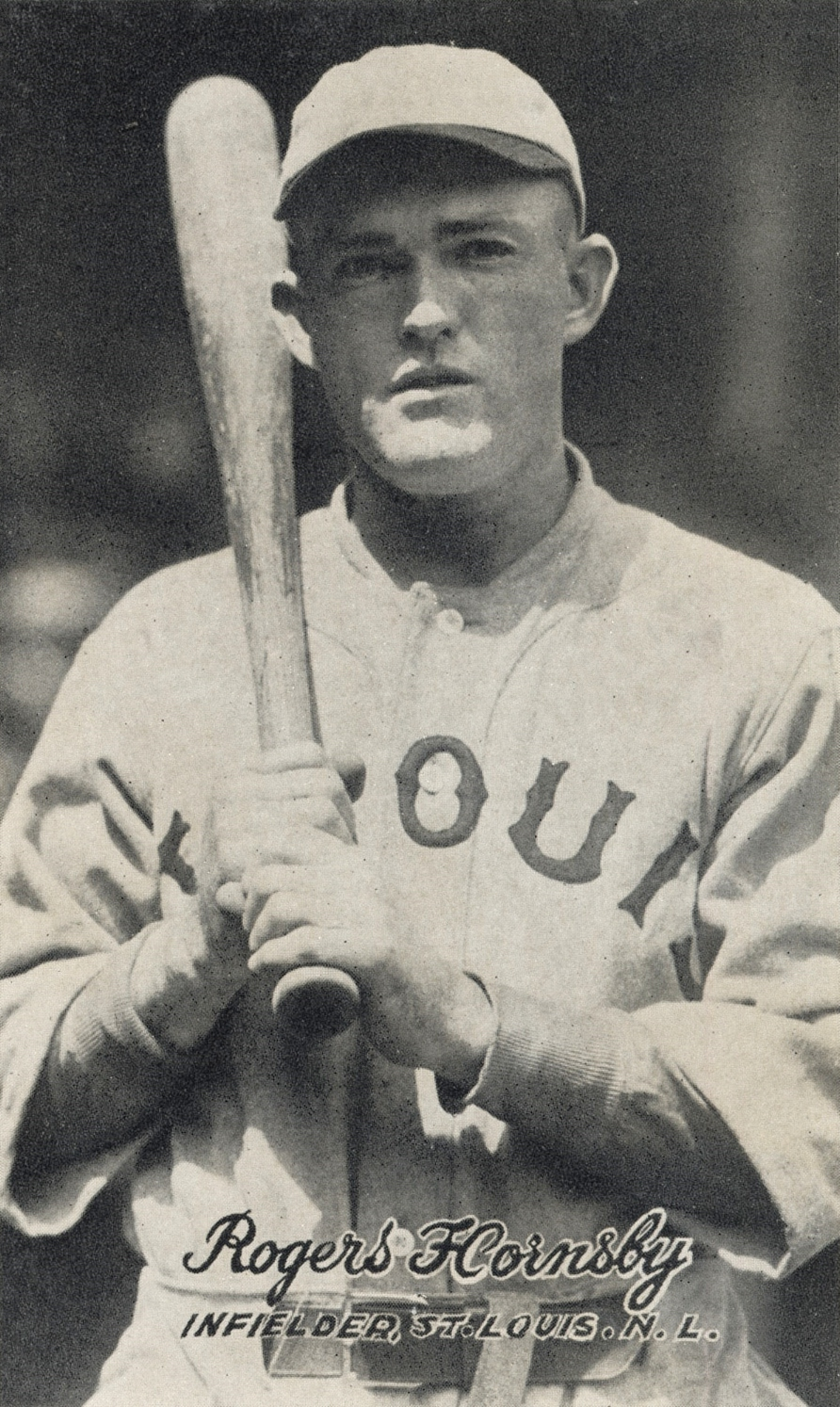
Rogers Hornsby

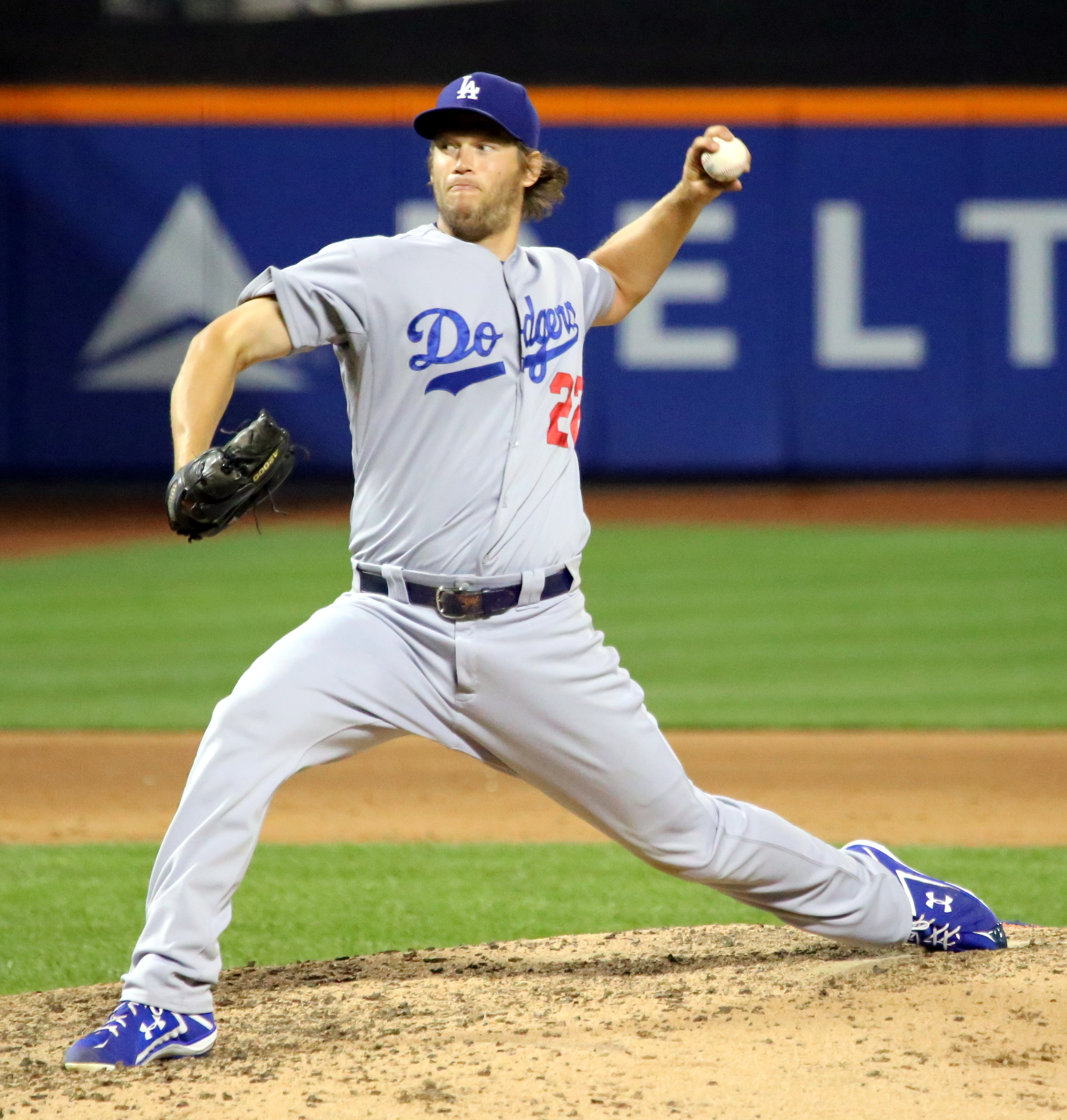
Clayton Kershaw

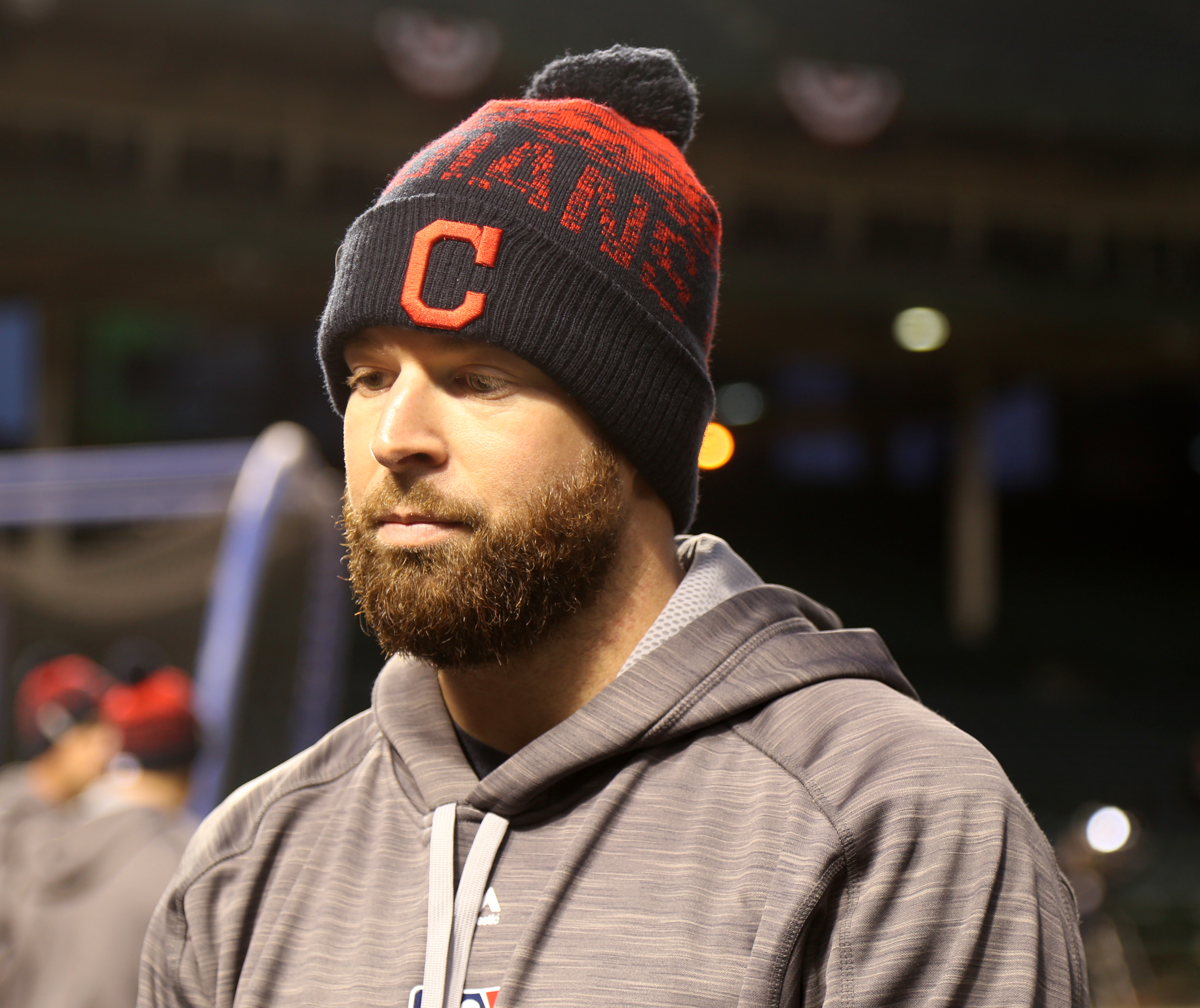
Corey Kluber

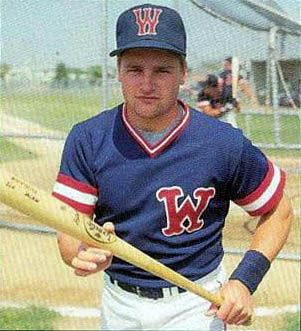
Chuck Knoblauch

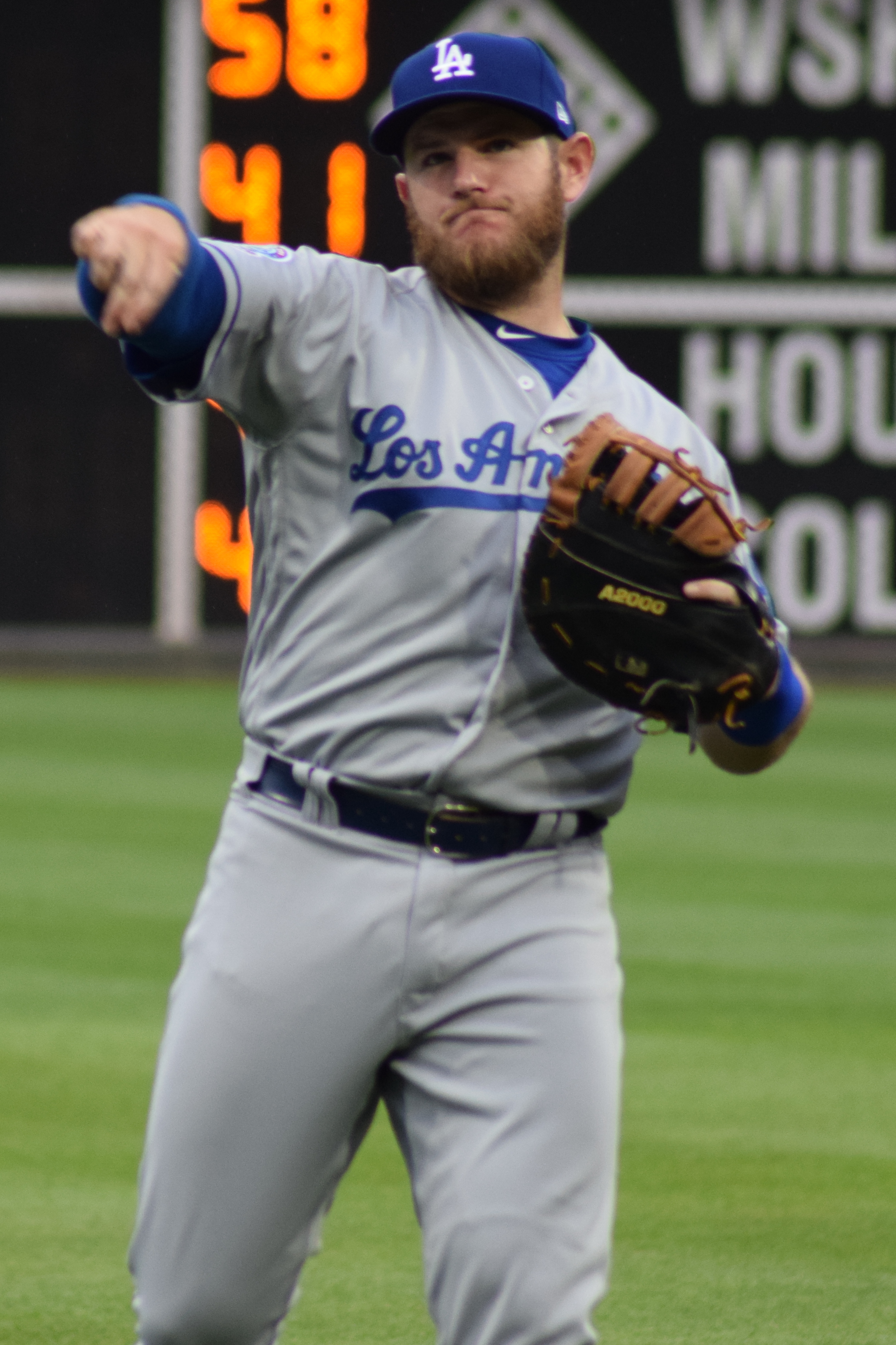
Max Muncy

- Yovani Gallardo (born 1986), starting pitcher for the Texas Rangers
- Ron Gant (born 1965), former MLB outfielder and second baseman
- Jaime García (born 1986), starting pitcher for the New York Yankees
- Cito Gaston (born 1944), former MLB center fielder and manager for the Toronto Blue Jays
- Evan Gattis (born 1986), player for the Houston Astros
- John Gibbons (born 1962), manager for the Toronto Blue Jays
- Ryan Goins (born 1988), infielder for the Toronto Blue Jays
- Paul Goldschmidt (born 1987), first baseman for the Arizona Diamondbacks
- Greg Golson (born 1985), former MLB outfielder
- Michael Gonzalez (born 1978), relief pitcher for the Baltimore Orioles
- Brian Gordon (born 1978), former MLB starting pitcher
- Jeff Gray (born 1981), former MLB relief pitcher
- Will Harris (born 1984), relief pitcher for the Houston Astros
- Brad Hawpe (born 1979), former MLB outfielder
- Danny Heep (born 1957), former MLB outfielder who played with several teams
- Chris Herrmann (born 1987), catcher, outfielder, and first baseman for the Arizona Diamondbacks
- Jordan Hicks (born 1996), pitcher for the St. Louis Cardinals
- Trey Hillman (born 1963), bench coach for the Houston Astros
- Bryan Holaday (born 1987), catcher for the Texas Rangers
- Brock Holt (born 1988), utility player for the Boston Red Sox
- Joe Horlen (1937–2022), All Star starting pitcher
- Rogers Hornsby (1896–1963), Hall of Fame infielder, manager; .358 career batting average, two-time NL MVP, earned two Triple Crowns, All-Century Team, first-team MLB All-Time Team
- Aubrey Huff (born 1976), former MLB infielder and outfielder
- Chad Huffman (born 1985), outfielder for the Cleveland Indians
- Philip Humber (born 1982), starting pitcher for the Oakland Athletics
- Jason Hursh (born 1991), relief pitcher for the Atlanta Braves
- Austin Jackson (born 1987), center fielder for the Cleveland Indians
- Conor Jackson (born 1982), former MLB outfielder
- Paul Janish (born 1982), shortstop for the Baltimore Orioles
- Kelly Johnson (born 1982), utility player for the New York Mets
- Gary Jones (born 1960), third base and infield coach for the Chicago Cubs
- Nate Karns (born 1987), starting pitcher for the Tampa Bay Rays
- Scott Kazmir (born 1984), starting pitcher for the Houston Astros
- Ty Kelly (born 1988), American-Israeli utility player
- Steve Kemp (born 1954), former outfielder, primarily with the Detroit Tigers
- Kyle Kendrick (born 1984), starting pitcher for the Colorado Rockies
- Clayton Kershaw (born 1988), starting pitcher for the Los Angeles Dodgers
- Corey Kluber (born 1986), starting pitcher for the Cleveland Indians
- Chuck Knoblauch (born 1968), former second baseman, played primarily with the Minnesota Twins and the New York Yankees
- John Lackey (born 1978), starting pitcher for the Chicago Cubs
- Ryan Langerhans (born 1980), outfielder for the Seattle Mariners
- Scott Linebrink (born 1976), former MLB pitcher
- Grady Little (born 1950), former baseball manager of the Los Angeles Dodgers, and Boston Red Sox
- Boone Logan (born 1984), relief pitcher for the Cleveland Indians
- James Loney (born 1984), first baseman for the Tampa Bay Rays
- Mark Lowe (born 1983), relief pitcher for the Toronto Blue Jays
- Tyler Lyons (born 1988), relief pitcher for the New York Yankees
- Greg Maddux (born 1966), Hall of Fame pitcher, primarily with the Chicago Cubs and Atlanta Braves
- Jeff Manship (born 1985), relief pitcher for the Cleveland Indians
- Robert Manuel (born 1983), relief pitcher for the Cincinnati Reds and Boston Red Sox
- Chris Martin (born 1986), relief pitcher for the New York Yankees
- Dustin May (born 1997), relief pitcher for the Los Angeles Dodgers
- Andrew McKirahan (born 1990), relief pitcher for the Atlanta Braves
- Jon Meloan (born 1984), former MLB pitcher
- Ryan Merritt (born 1992), starting pitcher for the Cleveland Indians
- Shelby Miller (born 1990), pitcher for the Arizona Diamondbacks
- Hoby Milner (born 1991), pitcher for the Tampa Bay Rays
- A. J. Minter (born 1993), relief pitcher for the Atlanta Braves
- Adam Moore (born 1984), catcher for the Cleveland Indians
- Jim Morris (born 1964), MLB player and oldest rookie
- Max Muncy (born 1990), infielder for the Los Angeles Dodgers
- David Murphy (born 1981), left fielder for the Cleveland Indians

N–R

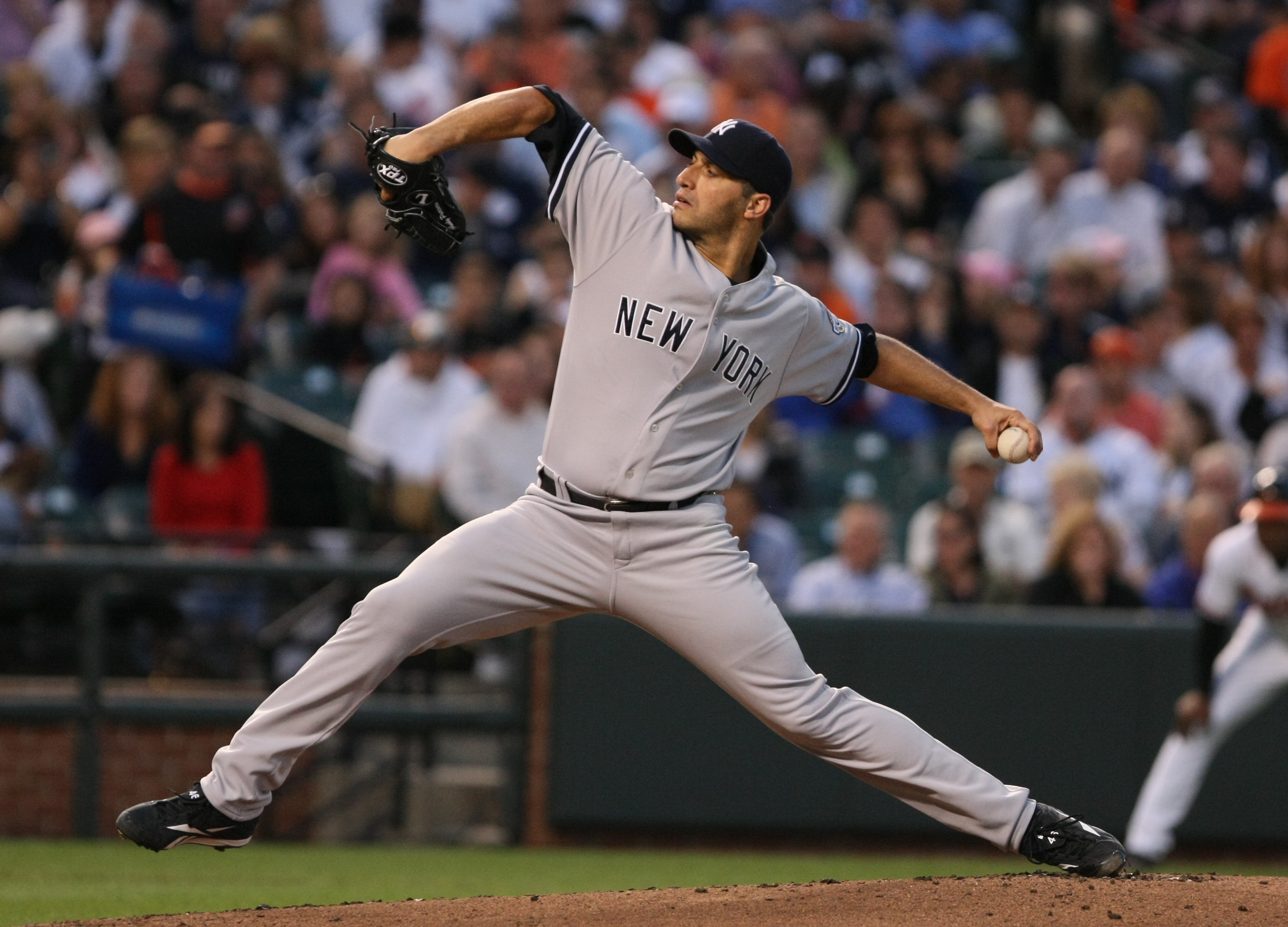
Andy Pettitte

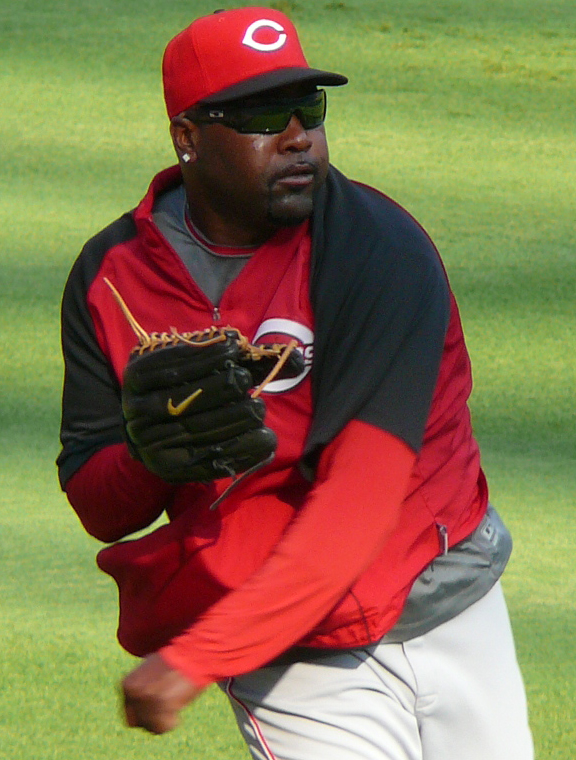
Arthur Rhodes

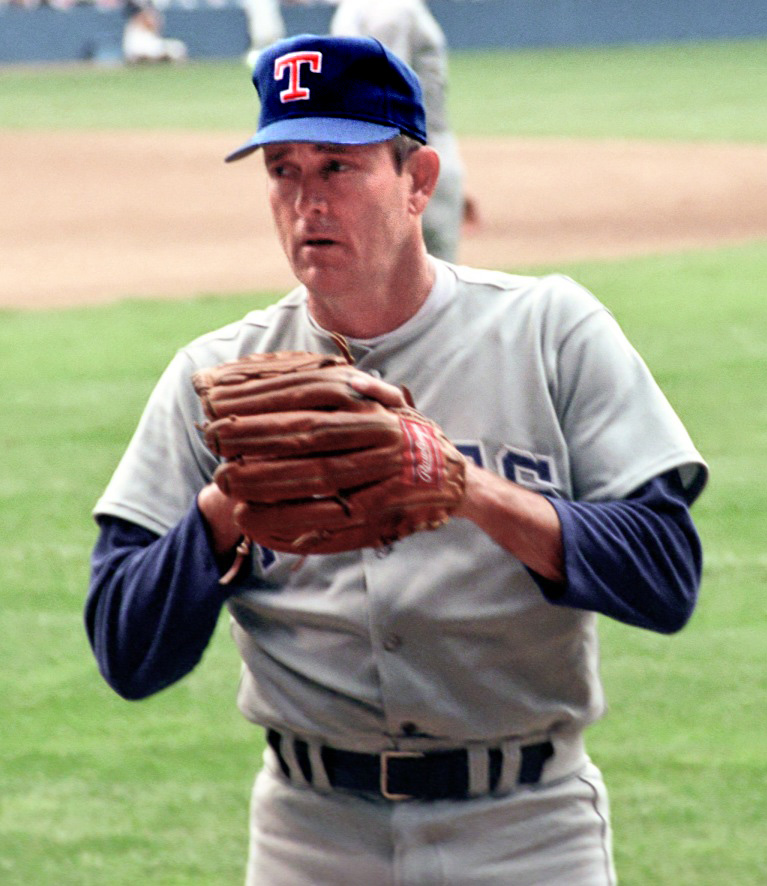
Nolan Ryan

- Tyler Naquin (born 1991), outfielder for the Cleveland Indians
- Joe Nathan (born 1974), relief pitcher for the Detroit Tigers
- Jeff Newman (born 1948), MLB All-Star baseball player for the Oakland A's and Boston Red Sox and manager
- Jeff Niemann (born 1983), starting pitcher for the Tampa Bay Rays
- Jayson Nix (born 1982), utility player for the New York Yankees
- Logan Ondrusek (born 1985), relief pitcher for the Cincinnati Reds
- Troy Patton (born 1985), relief pitcher for the Baltimore Orioles
- Hunter Pence (born 1983), right fielder for the San Francisco Giants
- Cliff Pennington (born 1984), infielder for the Toronto Blue Jays
- Andy Pettitte (born 1972), former starting pitcher for the New York Yankees and Houston Astros
- Colin Poche (born 1994), relief pitcher for the Tampa Bay Rays
- Ryan Pressly (born 1988), pitcher for the Houston Astros
- David Purcey (born 1982), relief pitcher for the Detroit Tigers
- Robert Ray (born 1984), relief pitcher for the Toronto Blue Jays
- Anthony Rendon (born 1990), infielder for the Washington Nationals
- Craig Reynolds (born 1952), former MLB shortstop, primarily with the Houston Astros
- Arthur Rhodes (born 1969), former MLB pitcher
- Will Rhymes (born 1983), second baseman for the Tampa Bay Rays
- Frank Robinson (1935–2019), won Triple Crown in both National League and American League, hit 586 career home runs, and was the first black manager in the Major Leagues
- Fernando Rodriguez (born 1984), relief pitcher for the Oakland Athletics
- David Rollins (born 1989), relief pitcher for the Seattle Mariners
- Chance Ruffin (born 1988), former MLB relief pitcher for the Seattle Mariners and Detroit Tigers
- Justin Ruggiano (born 1982), outfielder for the Seattle Mariners
- Nick Rumbelow (born 1991), relief pitcher for the New York Yankees
- Nolan Ryan (born 1947), Baseball Hall of Fame pitcher
- Reid Ryan (born 1971), president of the Houston Astros, son of Nolan Ryan

S–Z

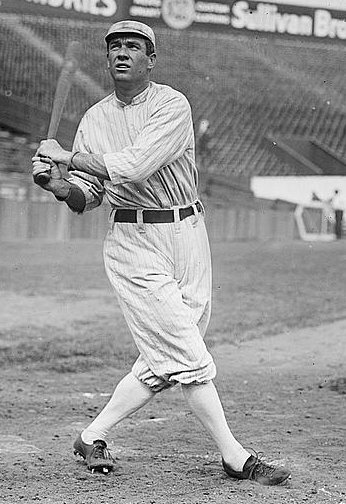
Tris Speaker

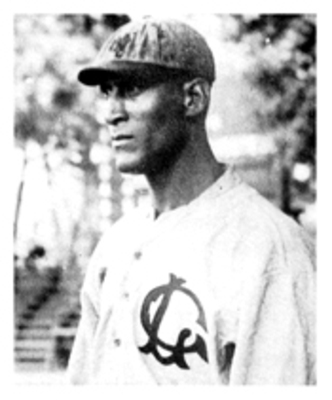
Smokey Joe Williams

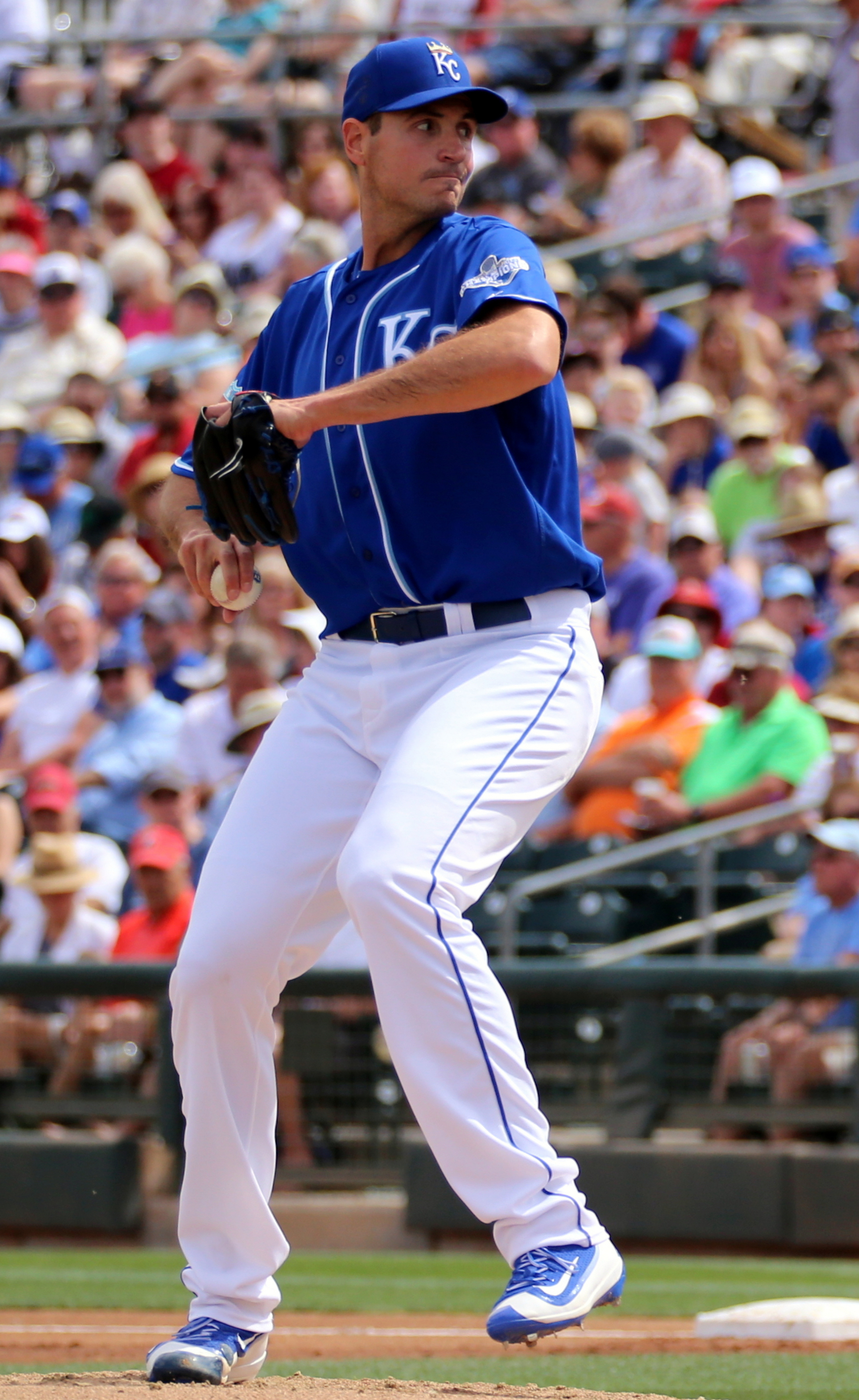
Chris Young

- Bo Schultz (born 1985), relief pitcher for the Toronto Blue Jays
- Kelly Shoppach (born 1980), former MLB catcher for several teams
- Matthew Silverman (born 1976), general manager and President for Baseball Operations for the Tampa Bay Rays
- Kevin Slowey (born 1984), former MLB starting pitcher for the Minnesota Twins and Miami Marlins
- Burch Smith (born 1990), pitcher for the Tampa Bay Rays
- Carson Smith (born 1989), closer for the Seattle Mariners
- Chris Snyder (born 1981), former MLB catcher
- Kyle Snyder (born 1977), pitching coach for the Tampa Bay Rays
- Tris Speaker (1888–1958), former MLB player and manager, member of the Baseball Hall of Fame
- Zach Stewart (born 1986), former MLB pitcher
- Monty Stratton (1912–1982), pitcher for the Chicago White Sox
- Huston Street (born 1983), closer for the Los Angeles Angels
- Ross Stripling (born 1989), relief pitcher for the Los Angeles Dodgers
- Drew Stubbs (born 1984), center fielder for the Texas Rangers
- Greg Swindell (born 1965), MLB pitcher for 17 seasons
- Blake Swihart (born 1992), catcher for the Boston Red Sox
- Jordan Tata (born 1981), former MLB pitcher
- Taylor Teagarden (born 1983), catcher for the Chicago Cubs
- Garry Templeton (born 1956), former MLB shortstop
- Ryan Tepera (born 1987), relief pitcher for the Toronto Blue Jays
- Jess Todd (born 1986), former MLB pitcher
- Shawn Tolleson (born 1988), closer for the Texas Rangers
- Josh Tomlin (born 1984), relief pitcher for the Atlanta Braves
- Anthony Vasquez (born 1986), starting pitcher for the Seattle Mariners
- Randy Velarde (born 1962), former MLB infielder and utility player, primarily with the New York Yankees
- Jordan Walden (born 1987), pitcher for the St. Louis Cardinals
- Vernon Wells (born 1978), three-time All-Star outfielder for the Toronto Blue Jays
- Austen Williams (born 1992), pitcher for the Washington Nationals
- Smokey Joe Williams (1886–1951), baseball great
- Chris Withrow (born 1989), relief pitcher for the Atlanta Braves
- Bobby Witt Jr. (born 2000), shortstop for the Kansas City Royals
- Brandon Wood (born 1985), third baseman and shortstop for the Los Angeles Angels
- Kerry Wood (born 1977), former MLB relief pitcher
- Brandon Workman (born 1988), starting pitcher for the Boston Red Sox
- Anthony Young (1966–2017), former MLB pitcher
- Chris Young (born 1979), pitcher for the Kansas City Royals
- Chris Young (born 1983), outfielder for the New York Yankees

=== Basketball ===
A–M

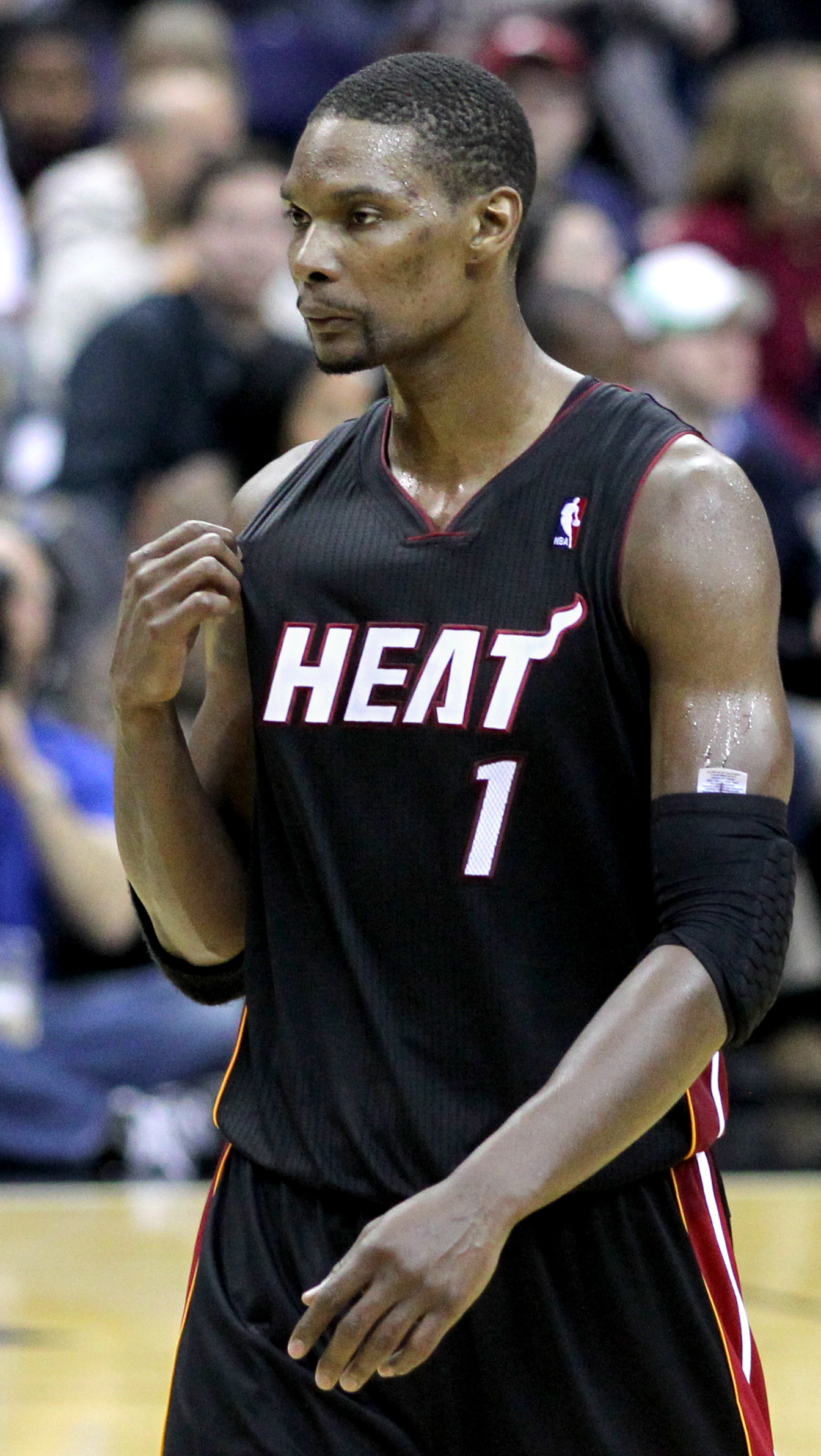
Chris Bosh

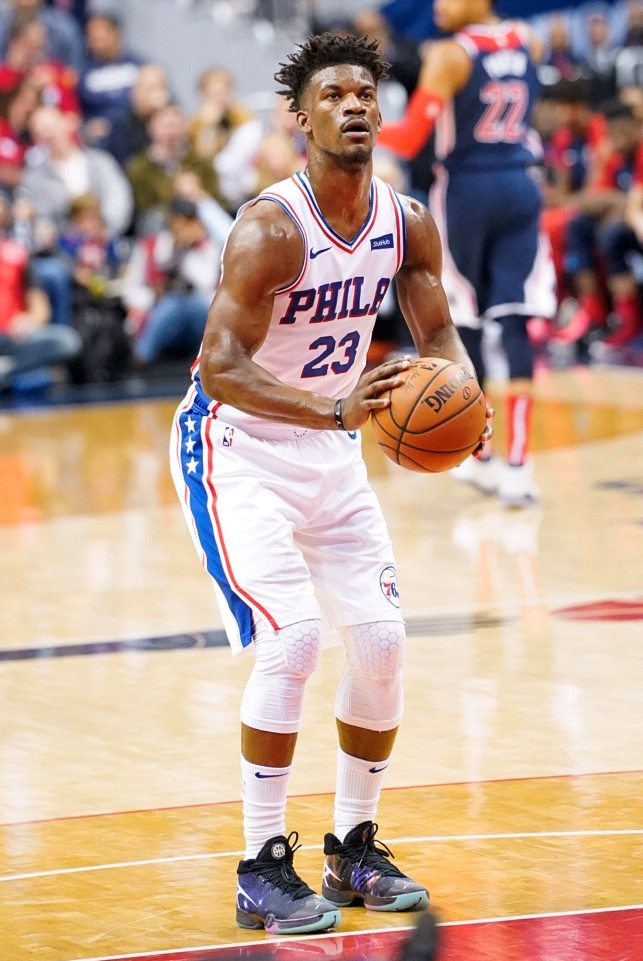
Jimmy Butler

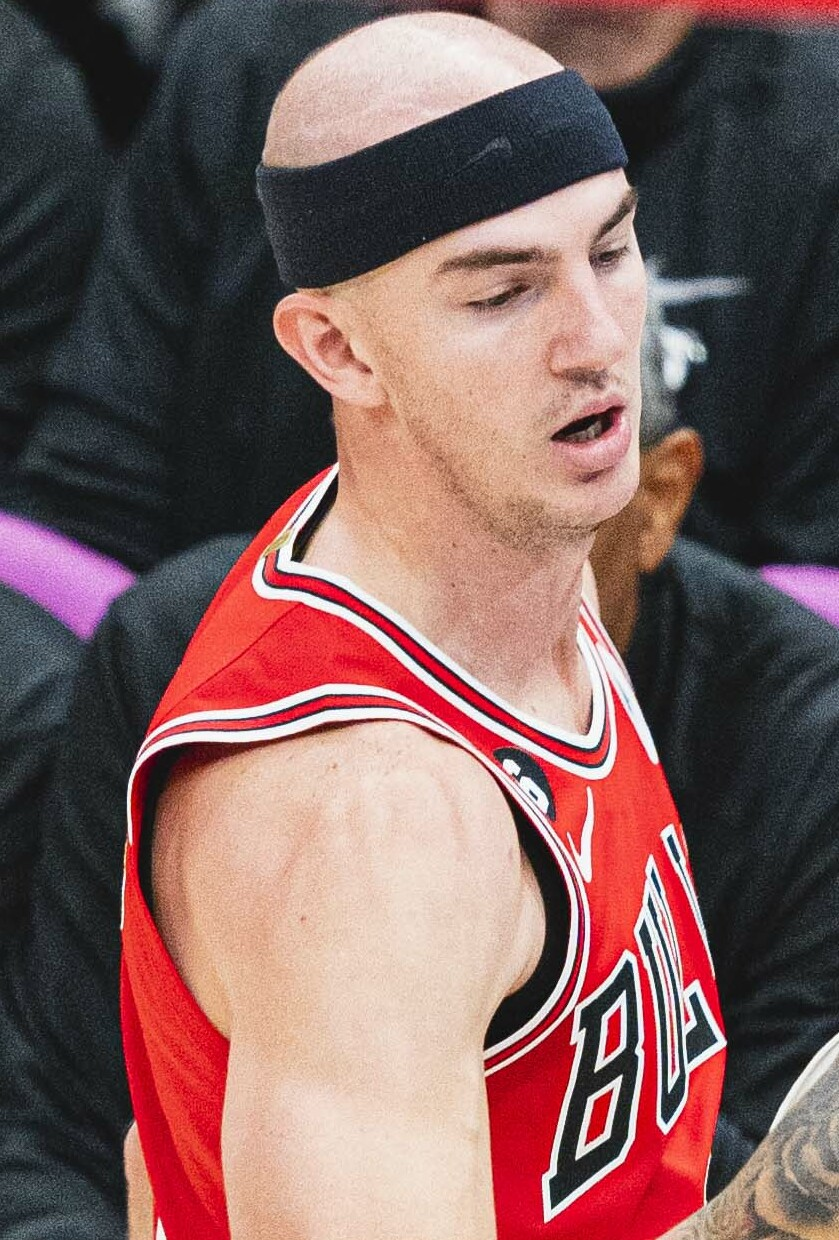
Alex Caruso

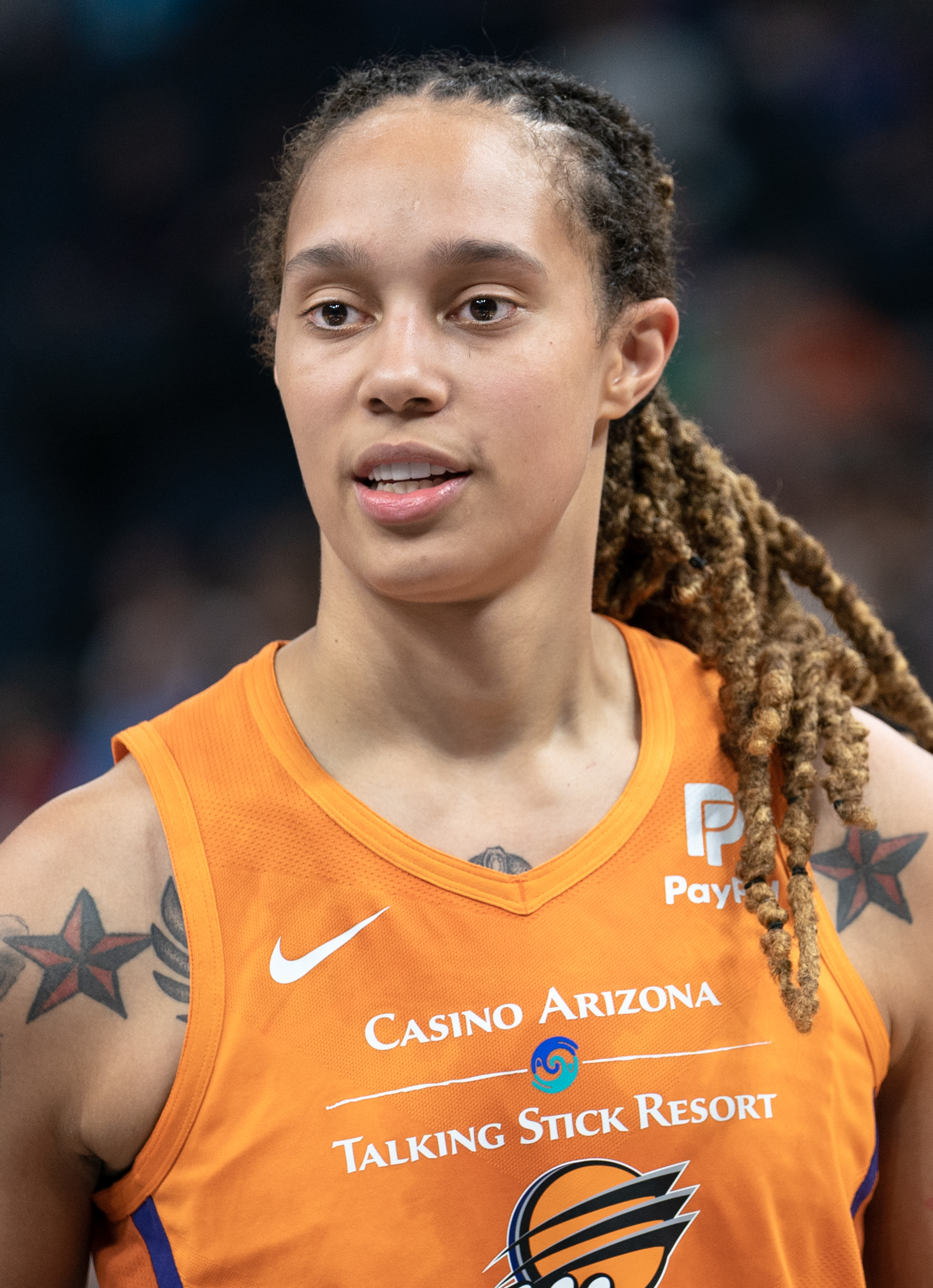
Brittney Griner

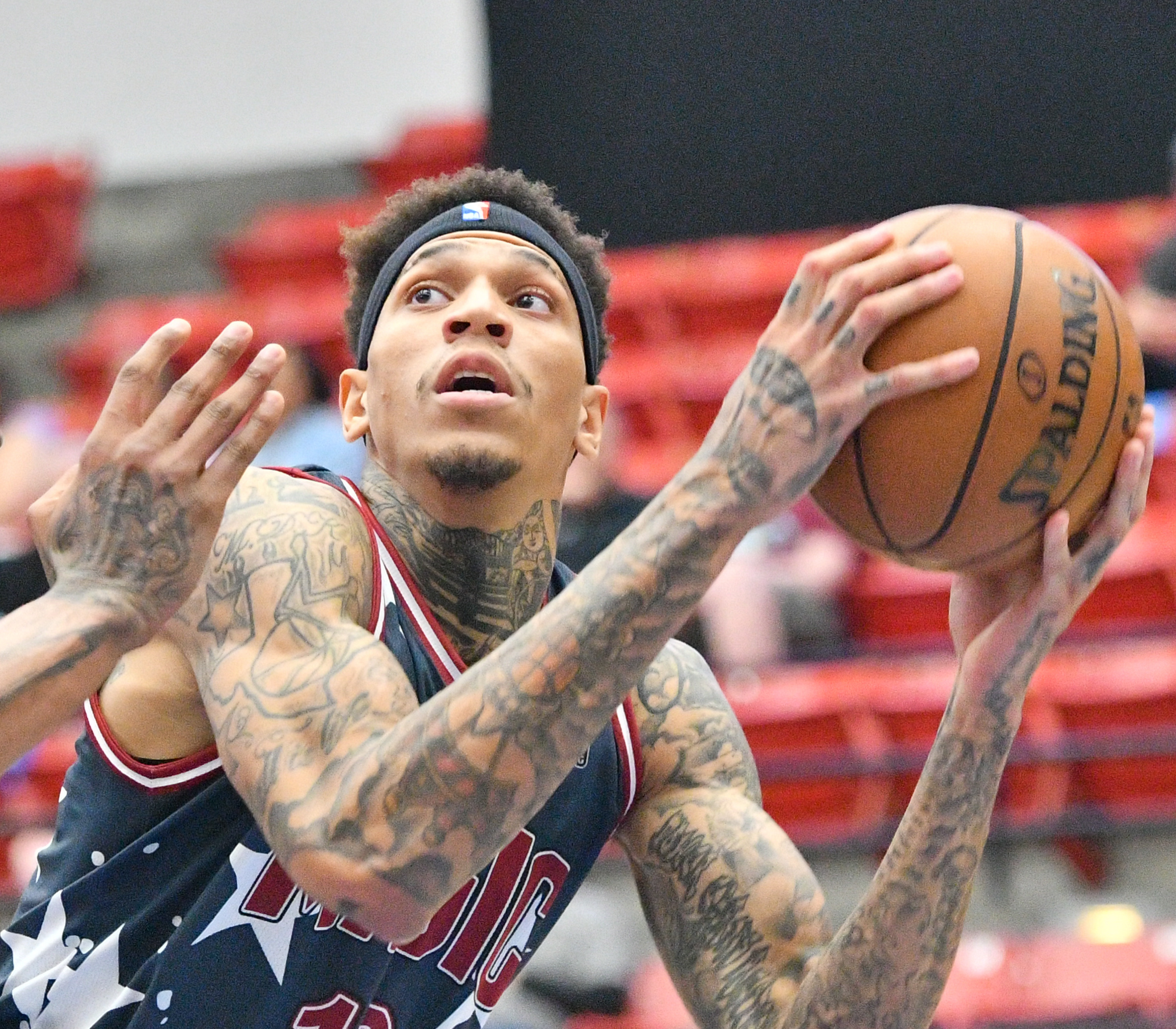
Michale Kyser

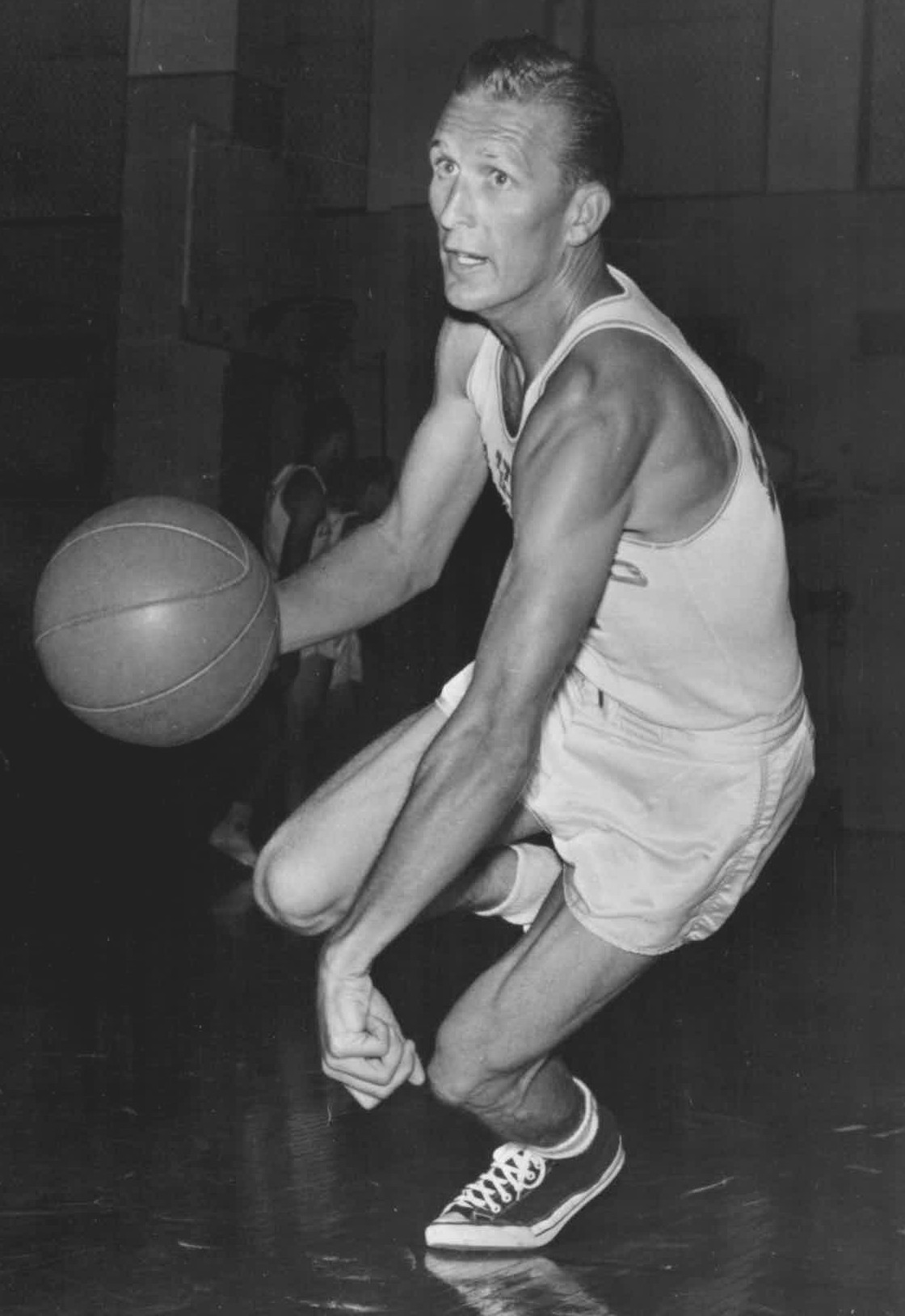
Slater Martin

- Quincy Acy (born 1990), former forward for the Dallas Mavericks
- LaMarcus Aldridge (born 1985),former NBA player, San Antonio Spurs, power forward
- Chris Andersen (born 1978), former power forward/center for the Miami Heat
- Darrell Arthur (born 1988), former power forward for the Denver Nuggets
- Maceo Baston (born 1976), former professional basketball player, power forward
- Tony Battie (born 1976), former NBA power forward/center
- Zelmo Beaty (1939–2013), former NBA center, member of Basketball Hall of Fame
- Peter Berry (born 2001), wheelchair basketball player for Alabama Crimson Tide
- Bill Blakeley (1934–2010), head coach, Dallas Chaparrals, University of North Texas
- Mookie Blaylock (born 1967), former NBA point guard
- Chris Bosh (born 1984), NBA player, Miami Heat, power forward
- J'Covan Brown (born 1990), basketball player in the Israel Basketball Premier League
- Jimmy Butler (born 1989), small forward/shooting guard for the Golden State Warriors
- Kaleb Canales (born 1978), assistant coach for the Dallas Mavericks
- Alex Caruso (born 1994), NBA point guard/shooting guard for the Oklahoma City Thunder
- T. J. Cline (born 1994), American-Israeli power forward/center in the Israeli Basketball Premier League
- Michael Cobbins (born 1992), basketball player for Maccabi Haifa of the Israeli Basketball Premier League
- Charli Collier (born 1999), WNBA center, No. 1 pick of 2021 WNBA draft
- Jody Conradt (born 1941), head coach for UT's Lady Longhorns
- Christian Cunningham (born 1997), forward in the Israeli Basketball Premier League
- Clyde Drexler (born 1962), Hall of Fame swingman for the Portland Trail Blazers and the Houston Rockets
- Mike Dunleavy Jr. (born 1980), small forward/shooting guard for the Chicago Bulls
- Ndudi Ebi (born 1984), Nigerian NBA basketball forward
- Carsen Edwards (born 1998), player for the Boston Celtics
- Kyler Edwards (born 1999), shooting guard in the Israeli Basketball Premier League
- Keenan Evans (born 1996), basketball player in the Israel Basketball Premier League
- T. J. Ford (born 1983), former NBA point guard
- Jeff Foster (born 1977), former NBA player
- Daniel Gibson (born 1986), point guard for the Cleveland Cavaliers
- Gerald Green (born 1986), shooting guard/small forward for the Houston Rockets
- Brittney Griner (born 1990), WNBA basketball player
- James Gulley (born 1965), center for Ironi Ramat Gan in the Israeli Basketball Premier League
- Terrel Harris (born 1987), guard for the Bakersfield Jam
- Grant Hill (born 1971), former seven-time NBA All-Star small forward
- Josh Huestis (born 1991), small forward for the Oklahoma City Thunder
- Stephen Jackson (born 1978), shooting guard/small forward for the San Antonio Spurs
- Wesley Johnson (born 1987), small forward/power forward for the Los Angeles Lakers
- Chris Jones (born 1993), shooting guard for Maccabi Tel Aviv of the Israeli Basketball Premier League
- Jalen Jones (born 1993), basketball player for Hapoel Haifa in the Israeli Basketball Premier League
- DeAndre Jordan (born 1988), center for the New Orleans Pelicans
- Luke Kornet (born 1995), player for the San Antonio Spurs
- Michale Kyser (born 1991), player for Hapoel Holon in the Israeli Basketball Premier League
- Monica Lamb-Powell (born 1964), player for Houston Comets
- Dave Lattin (born 1943), player for San Francisco Warriors/Phoenix Suns/Pittsburgh Condors/Memphis Tams
- Zach LeDay (born 1994), power forward in the Israeli Basketball Premier League
- Guy Lewis (1922–2015), Hall of Fame college basketball coach
- Rashard Lewis (born 1979), former forward for the Miami Heat
- Kenneth Lofton Jr. (born 2002), basketball power forward/center in the Israeli Basketball Premier League and NBA
- John Lucas III (born 1982), former point guard for the Utah Jazz
- Slater Martin (1925–2012), NBA player, elected to Basketball Hall of Fame
- Wesley Matthews (born 1986), shooting guard for the Dallas Mavericks
- Jason Maxiell (born 1983), power forward for the Charlotte Hornets
- Taj McWilliams-Franklin (born 1970), WNBA basketball power forward / center, gold medalist, New York Liberty
- C. J. Miles (born 1987), forward for the Cleveland Cavaliers
- Eric Moreland (born 1991), power forward and center for the Toronto Raptors
- Randolph Morris (born 1986), center for the Beijing Ducks
- Gerald Myers (born 1936), basketball coach 1971–1991; athletic director, Texas Tech University

N–Z

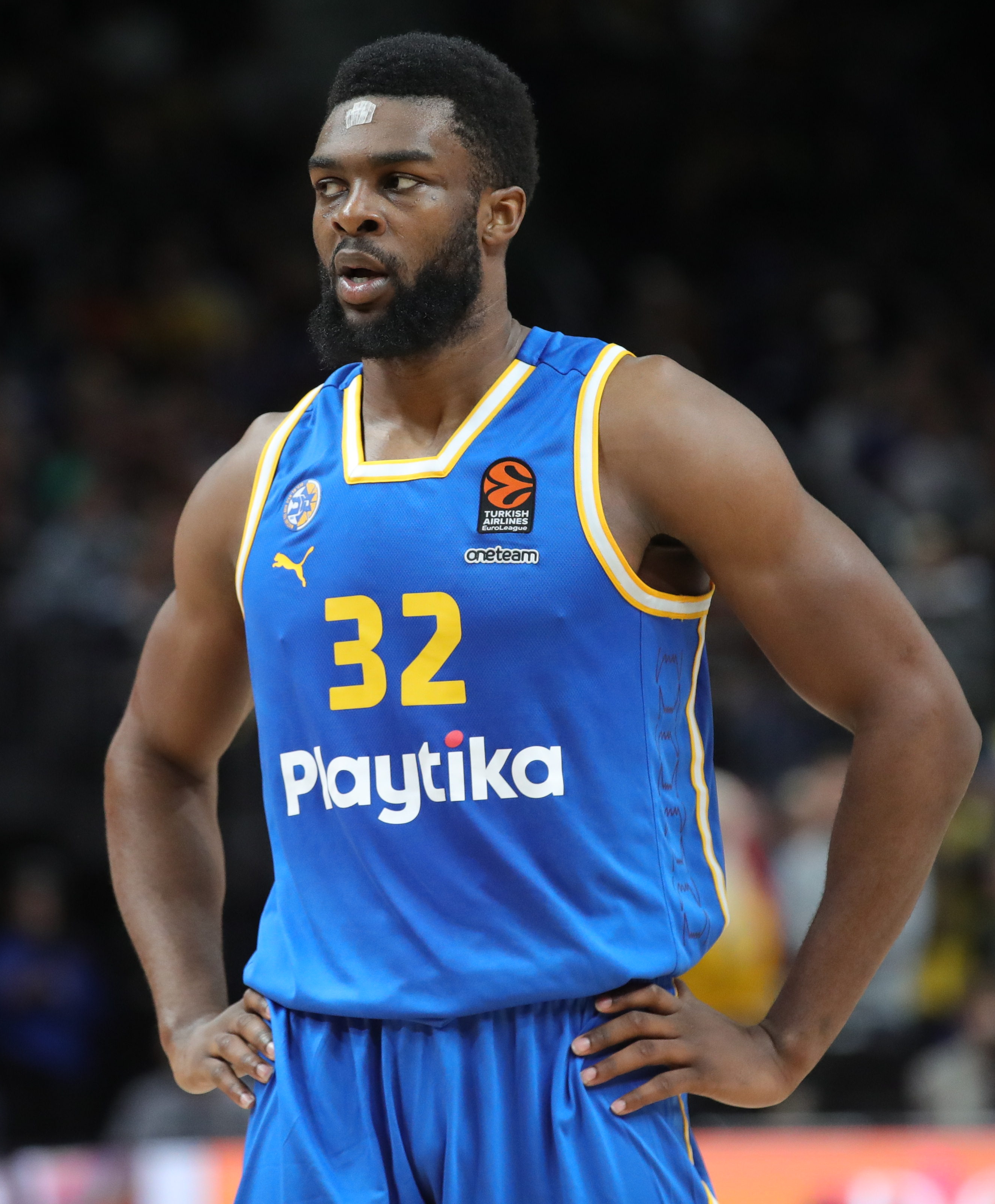
Josh Nebo

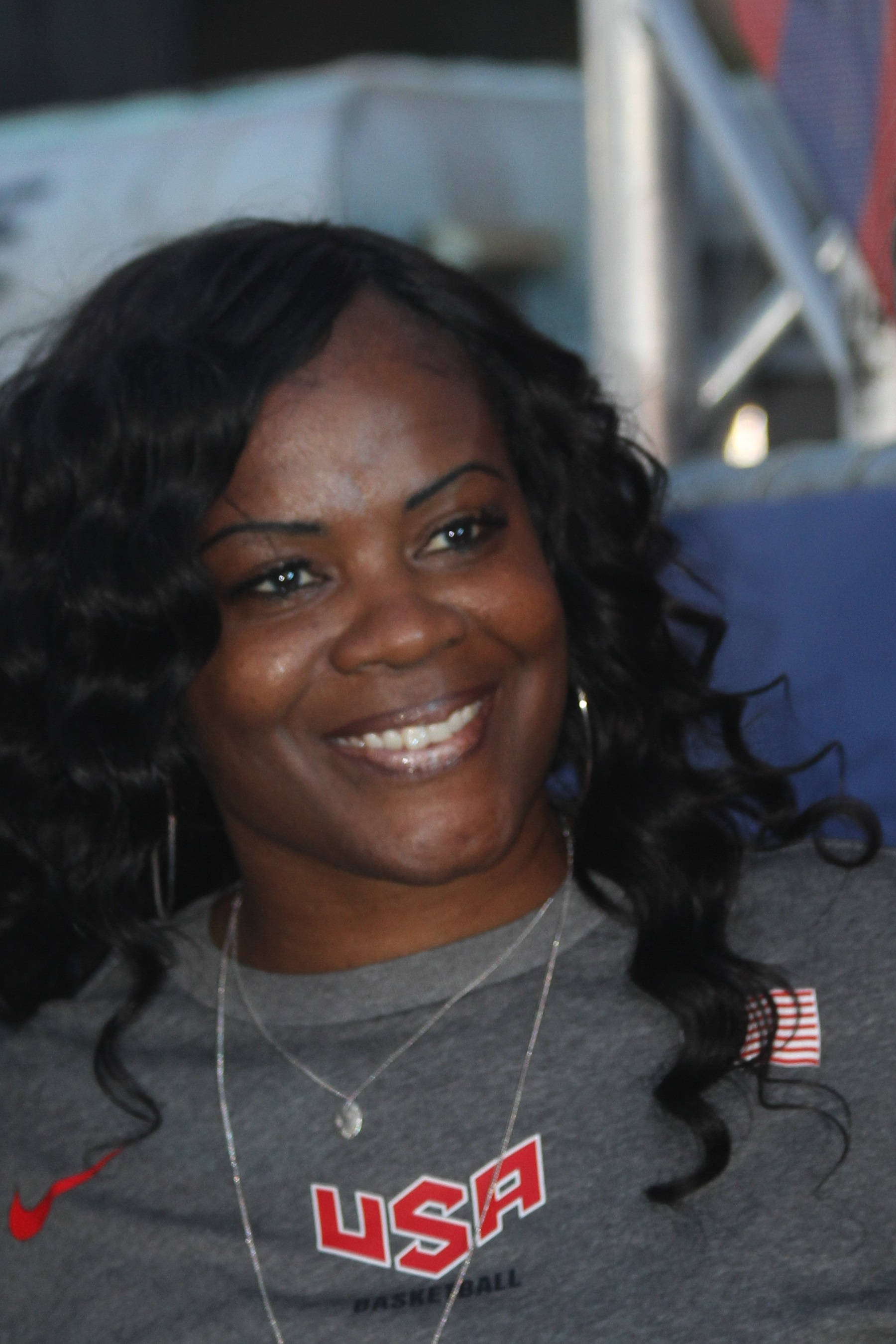
Sheryl Swoopes

- Eduardo Nájera (born 1976), former NBA forward
- Le'Bryan Nash (born 1992), player in the Israeli Basketball Premier League
- Josh Nebo (born 1997), player in the Israeli Basketball Premier League
- Rashard Odomes (born 1996), basketball guard and forward in the Israeli Basketball Premier League
- Emeka Okafor (born 1982), player for the Phoenix Suns
- Ike Ofoegbu (born 1984), American-Nigerian Israeli Premier Basketball League player
- Kevin Ollie (born 1972), former NBA point guard
- Shaquille O'Neal (born 1972), former NBA 15-time All-Star center
- Kendrick Perkins (born 1984), center for the Oklahoma City Thunder
- Terran Petteway (born 1992), guard/forward in the Israeli Basketball Premier League
- Dexter Pittman (born 1988), center for the Atlanta Hawks
- Ronnie Price (born 1983), point guard for the Orlando Magic
- Taurean Prince (born 1994), small forward for the Brooklyn Nets
- André Roberson (born 1991), forward for the Oklahoma City Thunder
- Taylor Rochestie (born 1985) American-Montenegrin player for Hapoel Haifa of the Israel Basketball Premier League
- Dennis Rodman (born 1961), former NBA forward, played primarily with the Detroit Pistons and Chicago Bulls
- Quinton Ross (born 1981), former NBA player
- Jason Siggers (born 1985), basketball shooting guard in the Israel Basketball Premier League
- Xavier Silas (born 1988), player for the Maccabi Ashdod B.C.
- Jonathon Simmons (born 1989), player for the San Antonio Spurs
- Odyssey Sims (born 1992), player for Baylor Lady Bears basketball
- Donald Sloan (born 1988), guard for the Indiana Pacers
- Jaleen Smith (born 1994), guard in the Israeli Basketball Premier League
- Ken Spain (1946–1990), center for the Chicago Bulls/Pittsburgh Condors
- Sheryl Swoopes (born 1971), WNBA, Olympic gold medalist
- Elijah Thomas (born 1996), basketball player for Bnei Herzliya in the Israeli Basketball Premier League
- Kurt Thomas (born 1972), former NBA player
- Wayman Tisdale (1964–2009), NBA power forward
- Ben Uzoh (born 1988), Nigerian-American point guard for the Canton Charge
- Willie Warren (born 1989), guard for the Szolnoki Olaj KK
- Deron Williams (born 1984), point guard for the Dallas Mavericks
- Sean Williams (born 1986), power forward/center for the Selçuk Üniversitesi BK
- Tex Winter (1922–2018), former basketball coach, innovator of the triangle offense, Hall of Fame inductee
- Bracey Wright, basketball guard for the Minnesota Timberwolves, Israeli Basketball Premier League

=== Bodybuilding ===
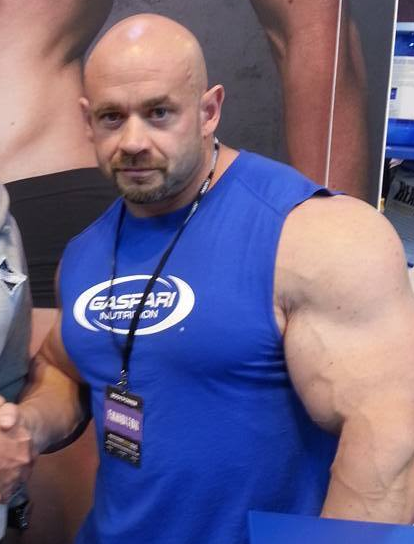
Branch Warren

- Heather Armbrust (born 1977), IFBB professional bodybuilder
- Tina Chandler (born 1974), IFBB professional bodybuilder
- Ronnie Coleman (born 1964), eight-time Mr. Olympia IFBB professional bodybuilder
- Laura Creavalle (born 1959), Guyanese-born Canadian/American professional bodybuilder
- Vickie Gates (born 1962), IFBB professional bodybuilder
- Kristy Hawkins (born 1980), IFBB professional bodybuilder
- Iris Kyle (born 1974), ten-time overall Ms. Olympia professional bodybuilder
- Colette Nelson (born 1974), IFBB professional bodybuilder
- Yaxeni Oriquen-Garcia (born 1966), IFBB professional bodybuilder
- Betty Pariso (born 1956), IFBB professional bodybuilder
- Denise Rutkowski (born 1961), IFBB professional bodybuilder
- Alana Shipp (born 1982), American-Israeli IFBB professional bodybuilder
- Branch Warren (born 1975), American retired IFBB Pro League professional bodybuilder

=== Boxing ===
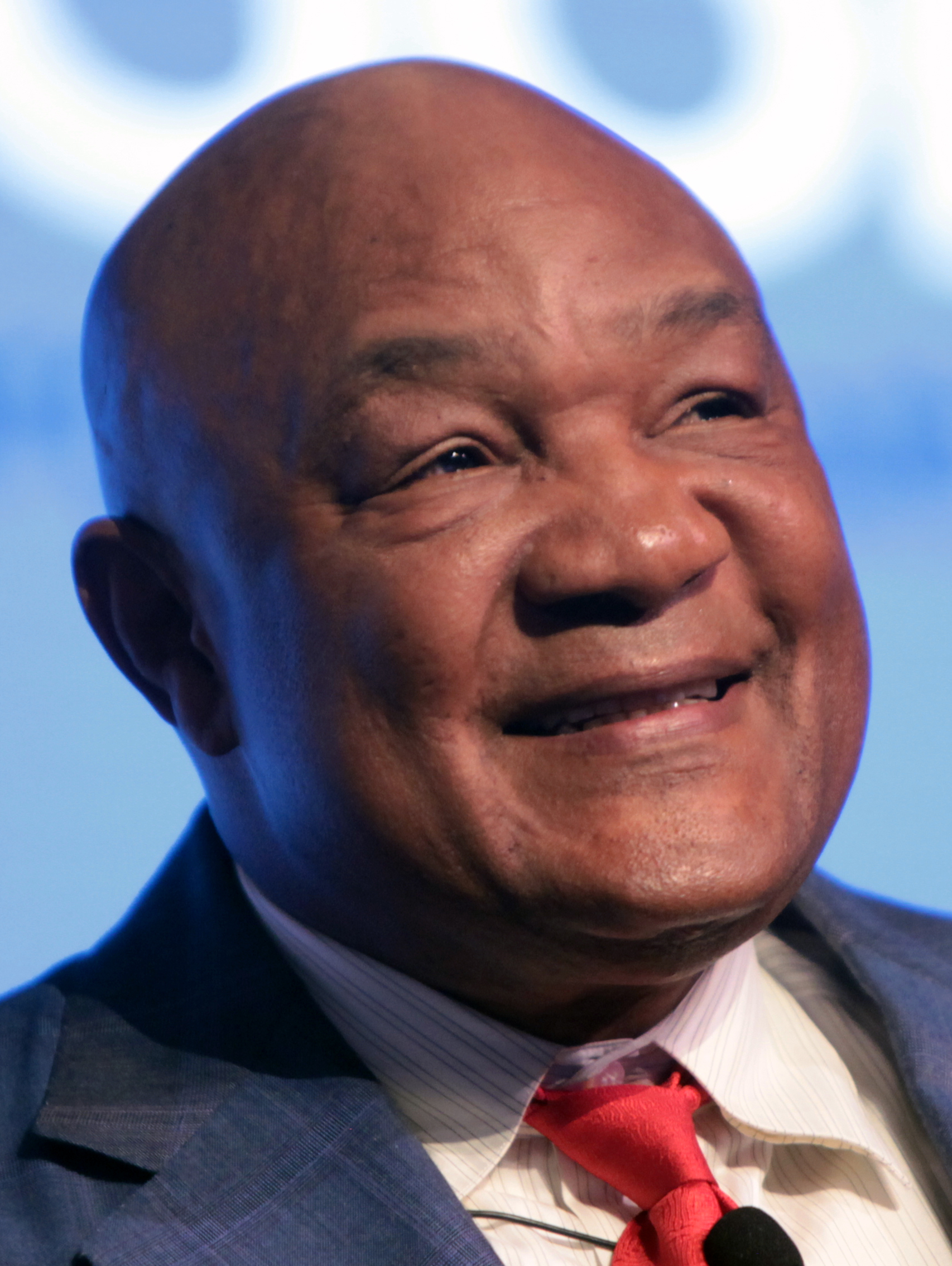
George Foreman

- Mike Ayala (born 1959), boxer
- Paulie Ayala (born 1970), world-champion boxer
- Tony Ayala Jr. (1963–2015), boxer
- Eric Carr (born 1975), Golden Gloves Champion
- Ruben Castillo (born 1957 in Lubbock), boxer
- Randall "Tex" Cobb (born 1950), boxer, fought for world heavyweight title
- Curtis Cokes (1937–2020), world champion boxer
- Bruce Curry (born 1956), world-champion boxer
- Donald Curry (born 1961), world-champion boxer
- Juan Díaz (born 1983), world-champion boxer
- Oscar Díaz (1982–2015), boxer
- Troy Dorsey (born 1962), world-champion boxer and kickboxer
- George Foreman (1949–2025), heavyweight champion boxer, entrepreneur, Christian ordained minister
- Roy Harris (1933–2023), boxer
- Gene Hatcher (born 1958), world-champion boxer
- Jack Johnson (1878–1946), boxer, first black heavyweight champion
- Quincy Taylor (born 1963), world-champion boxer

=== Football ===
A–B

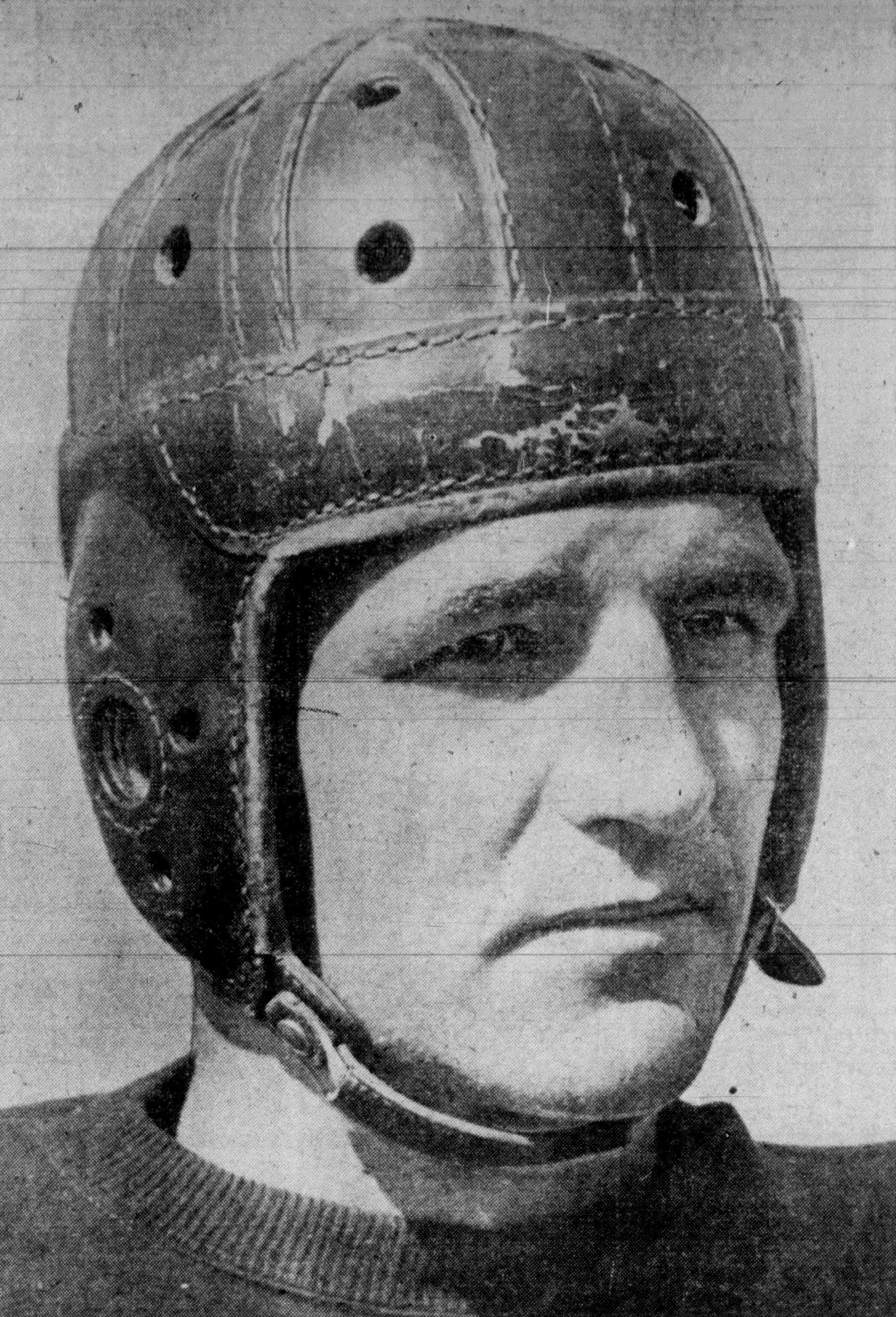
Sammy Baugh

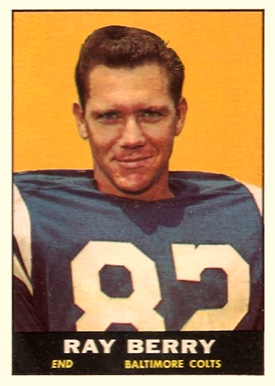
Raymond Berry

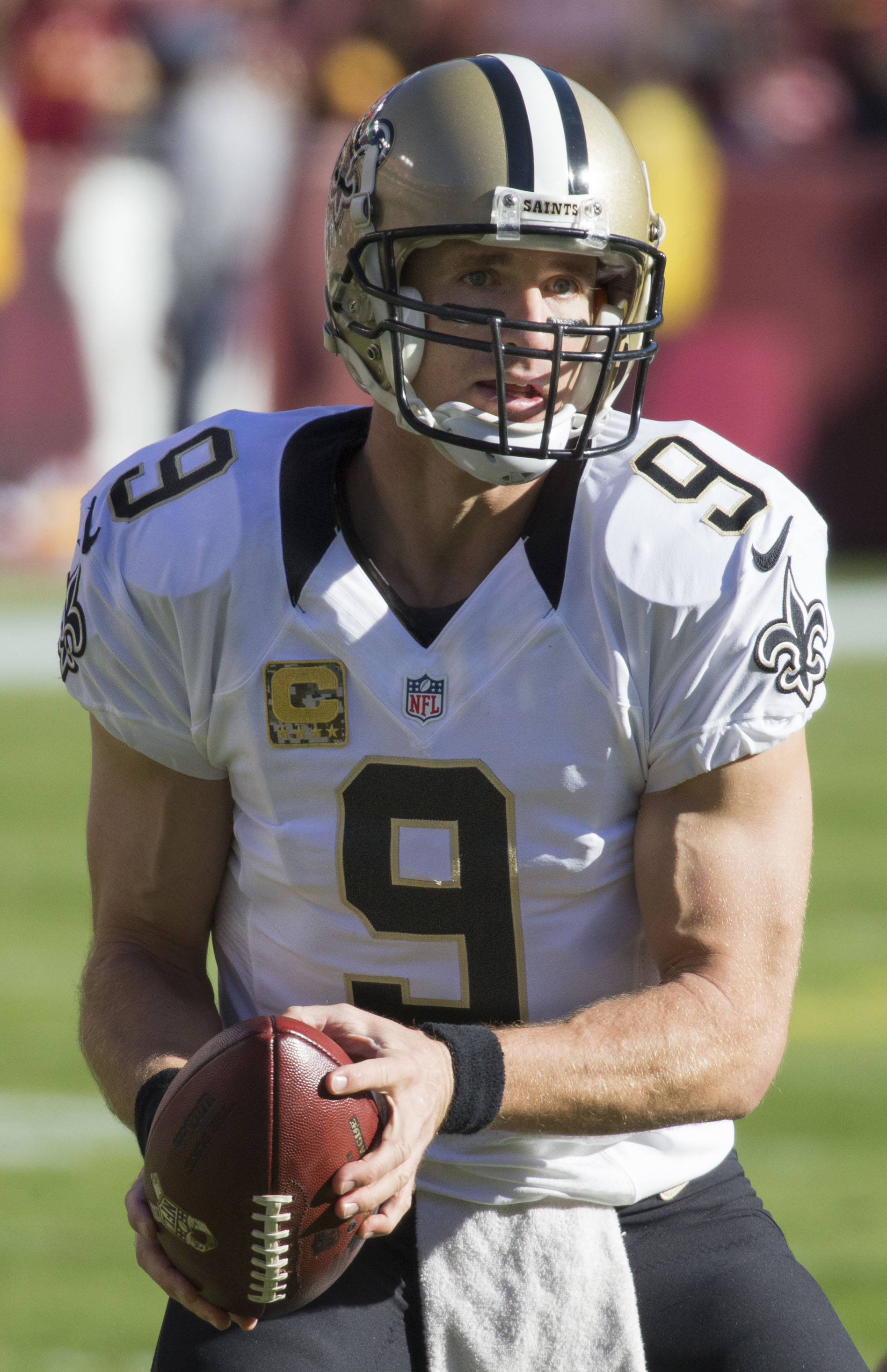
Drew Brees

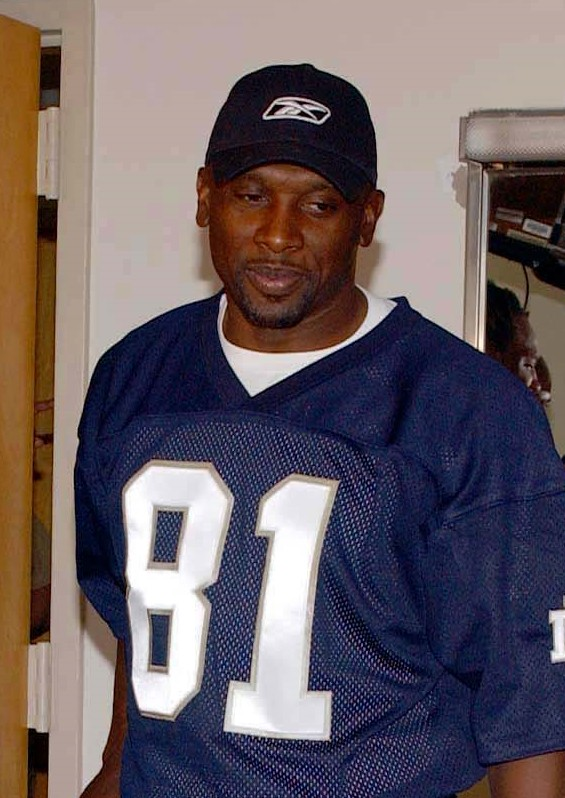
Tim Brown

- Emmanuel Acho (born 1990), linebacker for Philadelphia Eagles
- Sam Acho (born 1988), linebacker for Arizona Cardinals
- Jamal Adams (born 1995), NFL safety
- Joseph Addai (born 1983), running back for Indianapolis Colts
- Eric Alexander (born 1982), linebacker for Jacksonville Jaguars
- Jared Allen (born 1982), defensive end for Chicago Bears
- Lance Alworth (born 1940), wide receiver for San Diego Chargers, Dallas Cowboys
- Danny Amendola (born 1985), wide receiver, kickoff returner for New England Patriots
- Adrian Awasom (born 1983), defensive end for New York Giants, Minnesota Vikings
- Remi Ayodele (born 1983), defensive tackle for Minnesota Vikings
- Jonathan Babineaux (born 1981), defensive tackle for Atlanta Falcons
- Jordan Babineaux (born 1982), defensive back for Seattle Seahawks
- Stephen Baker (born 1964), wide receiver for New York Giants
- Chris Banjo (born 1990), NFL safety
- Joplo Bartu (born 1989), linebacker for Atlanta Falcons
- Arnaz Battle (born 1980), wide receiver for Pittsburgh Steelers
- Jackie Battle (born 1983), running back for Kansas City Chiefs
- Sammy Baugh (1914–2008), Hall of Fame quarterback, primarily with Washington Redskins
- Kelvin Beachum (born 1989), offensive lineman for Pittsburgh Steelers
- Cole Beasley (born 1989), wide receiver, return specialist for Buffalo Bills
- Byron Bell (born 1989), offensive tackle for Carolina Panthers
- Emory Bellard (1927–2011), college football coach
- Martellus Bennett (born 1987), tight end for New England Patriots
- Michael Bennett (born 1985), defensive end for Seattle Seahawks
- Cedric Benson (1982–2019), running back for Chicago Bears, Cincinnati Bengals
- Rocky Bernard (born 1979), defensive tackle for New York Giants
- Raymond Berry (1933–2026), NFL split end, member of Pro Football Hall of Fame
- Justin Blalock (born 1983), offensive guard for Atlanta Falcons
- Rhett Bomar (born 1985), quarterback for New York Giants
- David Boston (born 1978), NFL wide receiver
- Chris Boswell (born 1991), kicker for Pittsburgh Steelers
- Kyle Bosworth (born 1986), outside linebacker for Dallas Cowboys
- Bobby Boyd (1937–2017), All-Pro defensive back, Baltimore Colts, Oklahoma Sooners
- Drew Brees (born 1979), quarterback for New Orleans Saints
- Mike Brisiel (born 1983), guard for Oakland Raiders
- Michael Brockers (born 1990), defensive tackle for St. Louis Rams
- Aaron Brown (born 1985), running back, return specialist for Detroit Lions
- Chykie Brown (born 1986), cornerback for Baltimore Ravens
- Evan Brown (born 1996), NFL center
- Kris Brown (born 1976), placekicker for San Diego Chargers
- Malcom Brown (born 1994), defensive tackle for New England Patriots
- Tarell Brown (born 1985), cornerback for San Francisco 49ers
- Tim Brown (born 1966), NFL wide receiver and Pro Football Hall of Famer
- Dez Bryant (born 1988), wide receiver for Dallas Cowboys
- Matt Bryant (born 1975), placekicker for Atlanta Falcons
- Red Bryant (born 1984), defensive lineman for Jacksonville Jaguars
- Maury Buford (born 1960), NFL punter
- Melvin Bullitt (born 1984), defensive back for Indianapolis Colts
- Rex Burkhead (born 1990), running back for the New England Patriots

C–F

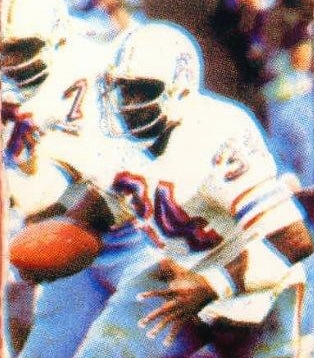
Earl Campbell

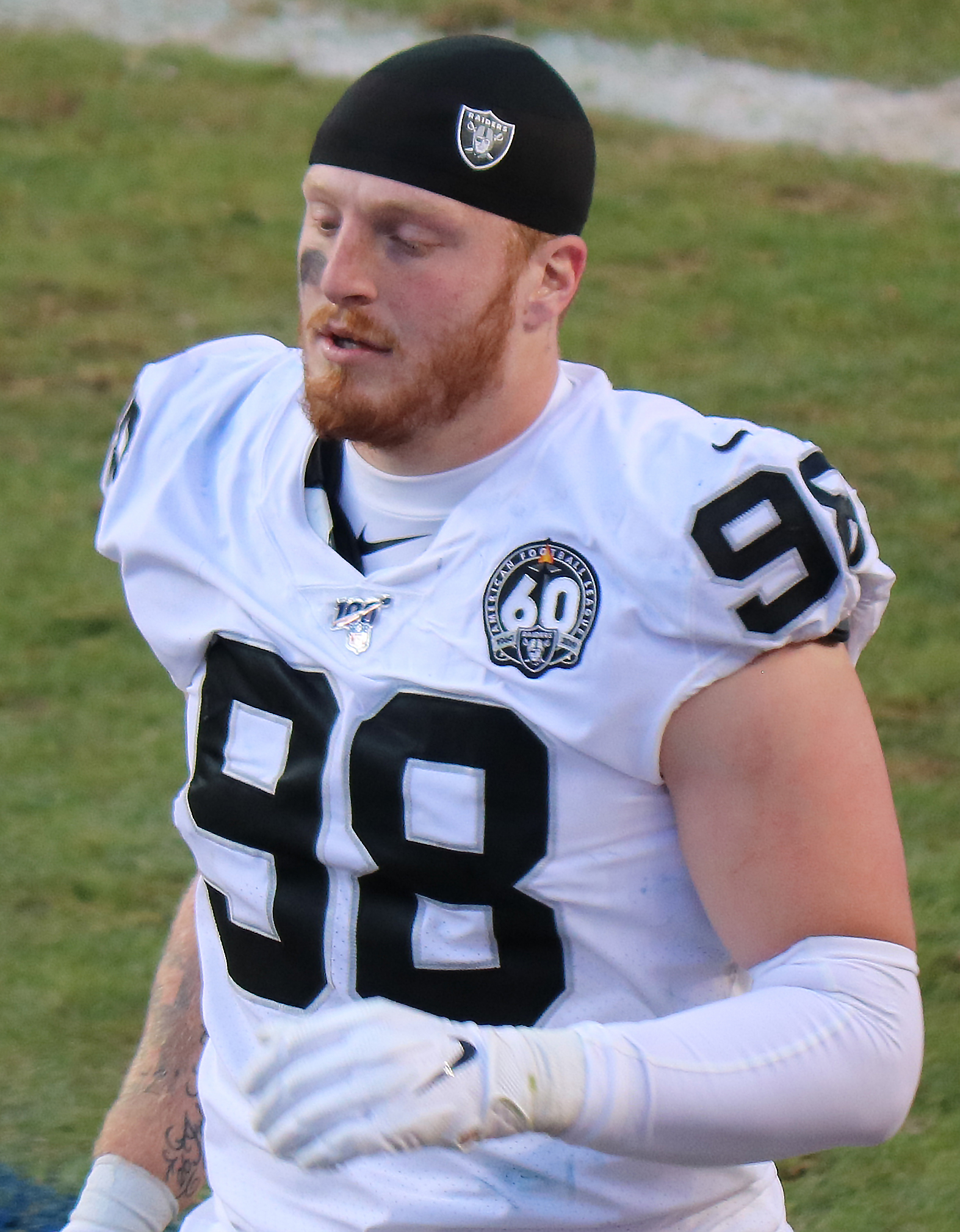
Maxx Crosby

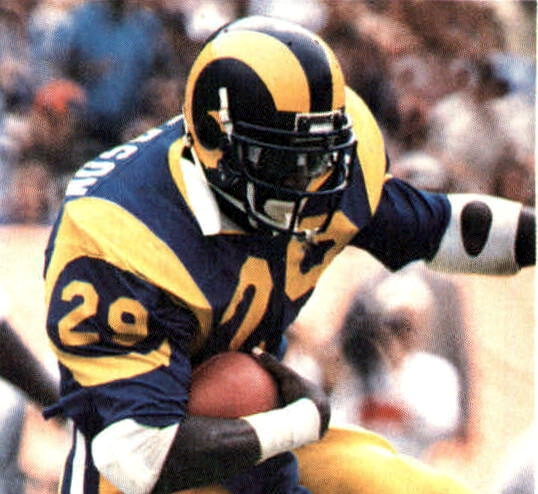
Eric Dickerson

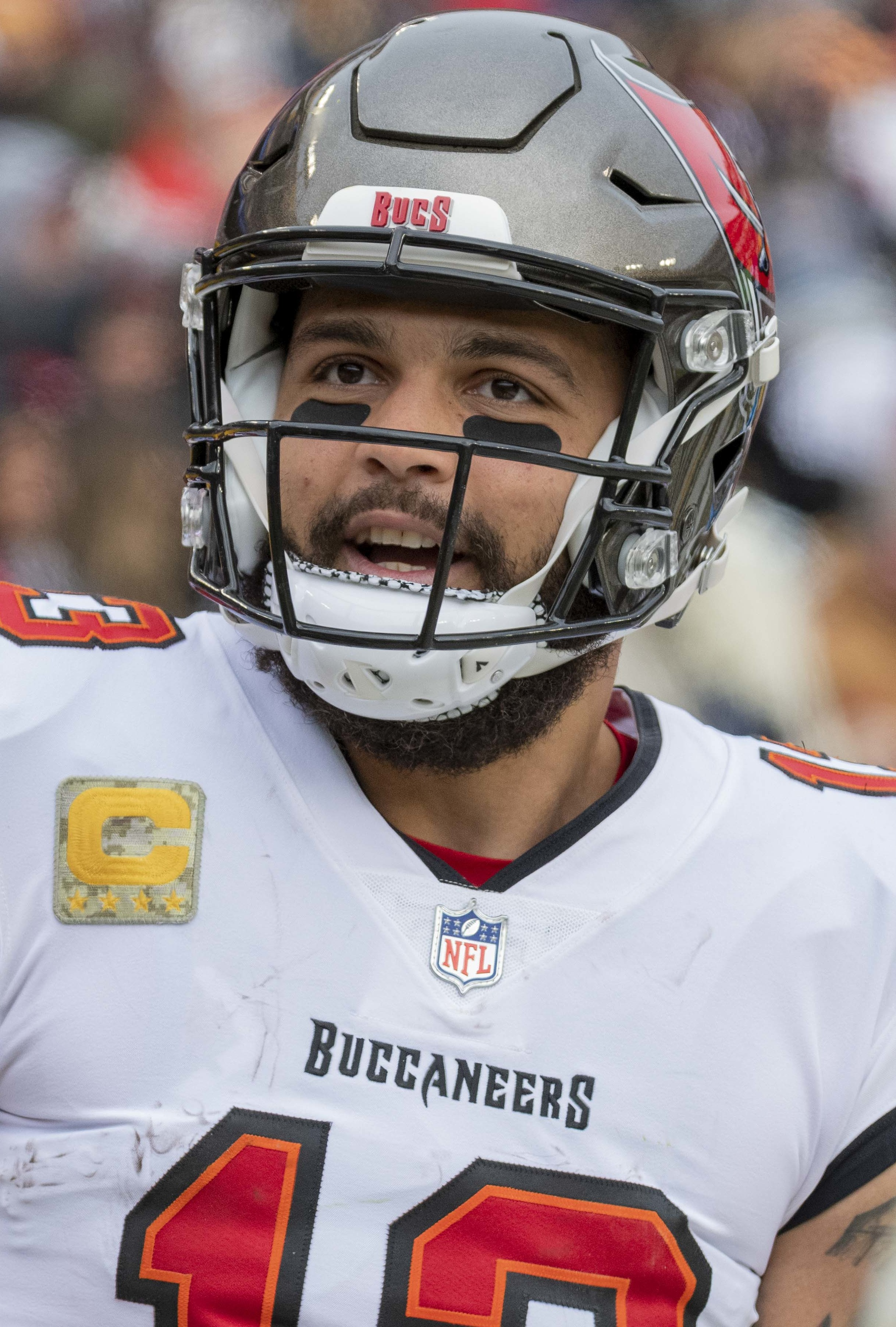
Mike Evans

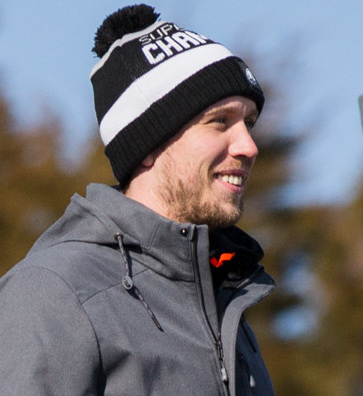
Nick Foles

- Earl Campbell (born 1955), Pro Football Hall of Famer, Heisman Trophy winner
- Marcus Cannon (born 1988), offensive tackle for New England Patriots
- Rock Cartwright (born 1979), running back for Washington Redskins
- James Casey (born 1984), tight end for Philadelphia Eagles
- Juan Castillo (born 1959), defensive coordinator for Philadelphia Eagles
- Scott Chandler (born 1985), tight end for Buffalo Bills
- Jamaal Charles (born 1986), running back for Kansas City Chiefs
- Jeromey Clary (born 1983), offensive guard for San Diego Chargers
- Keenan Clayton (born 1987), outside linebacker for Oakland Raiders
- Perrish Cox (born 1987), cornerback, return specialist for San Francisco 49ers
- Michael Crabtree (born 1987), wide receiver for San Francisco 49ers
- Patrick Crayton (born 1979), wide receiver for San Diego Chargers
- Mason Crosby (born 1984), placekicker for Green Bay Packers
- Maxx Crosby (born 1997), NFL defensive end
- John David Crow (1935–2015), Heisman Trophy winner, NFL running back, coach and college athletics administrator
- Andy Dalton (born 1987), quarterback for Cincinnati Bengals
- Chase Daniel (born 1986), quarterback for New Orleans Saints, Kansas City Chiefs
- Jaelon Darden (born 1999), NFL wide receiver
- Marcus Davenport (born 1996), NFL defensive end
- Cody Davis (born 1989), safety for St. Louis Rams
- Knile Davis (born 1991), running back for Kansas City Chiefs
- Leonard Davis (born 1978), guard for Dallas Cowboys
- Phil Dawson (born 1975), placekicker for San Francisco 49ers
- Quintin Demps (born 1985), safety for New York Giants
- Trevor Denbow (born 1998), NFL safety
- Ty Detmer (born 1967), NFL quarterback
- Eric Dickerson (born 1960), NFL running back and Pro Football Hall of Famer
- Quandre Diggs (born 1993), NFL safety
- Zac Diles (born 1985), linebacker for Houston Texans
- J. K. Dobbins (born 1998), NFL running back
- Derrick Dockery (born 1980), guard for Dallas Cowboys
- Donald Driver (born 1975), wide receiver for Green Bay Packers
- Ron Edwards (born 1979), defensive tackle for Carolina Panthers
- Ikemefuna Enemkpali (born 1991), linebacker for Buffalo Bills
- Mike Evans (born 1993), wide receiver for the Tampa Bay Buccaneers
- Thomas Everett (born 1964), NFL safety and College Football Hall of Famer
- Erik Ezukanma (born 2000), NFL wide receiver
- Jermichael Finley (born 1987), tight end for Green Bay Packers
- Cameron Fleming (born 1992), offensive tackle for New England Patriots
- Jamell Fleming (born 1989), cornerback for Kansas City Chiefs
- Larry Flowers (born 1958), NFL safety, primarily with New York Giants
- Tre Flowers (born 1995), NFL cornerback
- Matt Flynn (born 1985), quarterback for Green Bay Packers
- Nick Foles (born 1989), quarterback for Philadelphia Eagles, St. Louis Rams
- Justin Forsett (born 1985), running back for Seattle Seahawks
- Barry Foster (born 1968), NFL running back
- Jack Fox (born 1996), NFL punter
- Jason Curtis Fox (born 1988), offensive tackle for Miami Dolphins
- Robert Francois (born 1985), linebacker for Green Bay Packers
- Jerrell Freeman (born 1986), linebacker for Indianapolis Colts

G–I

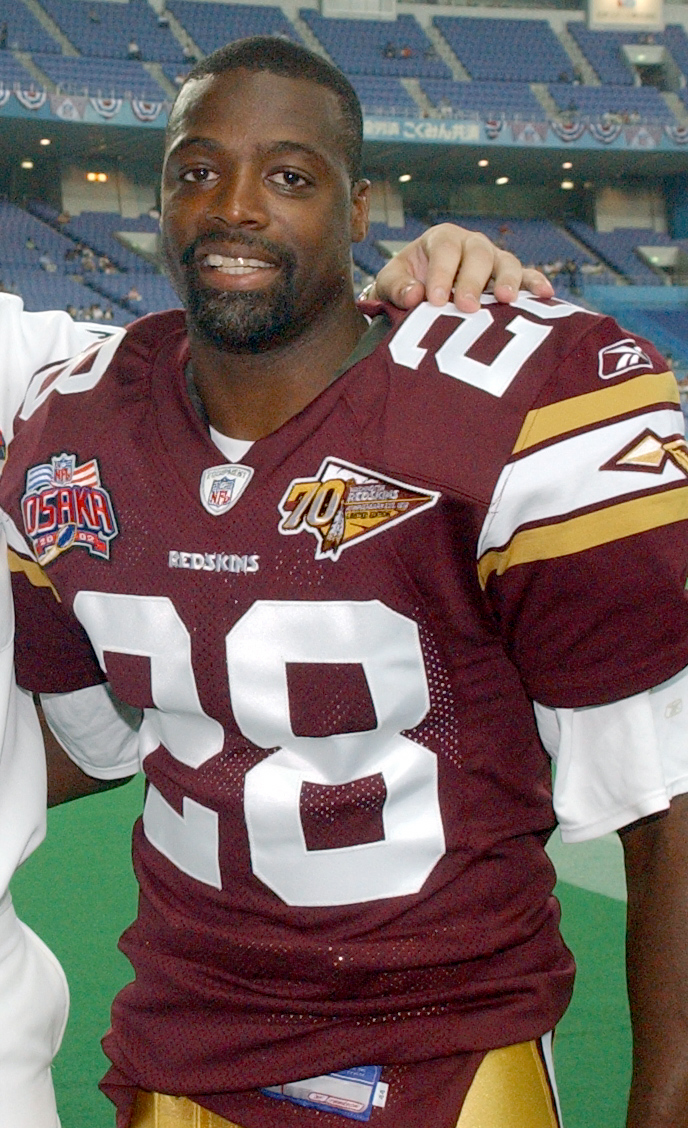
Darrell Green

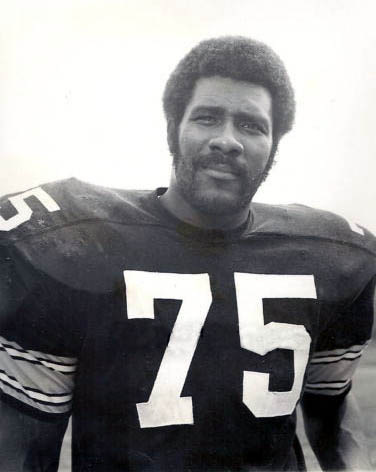
Joe Greene

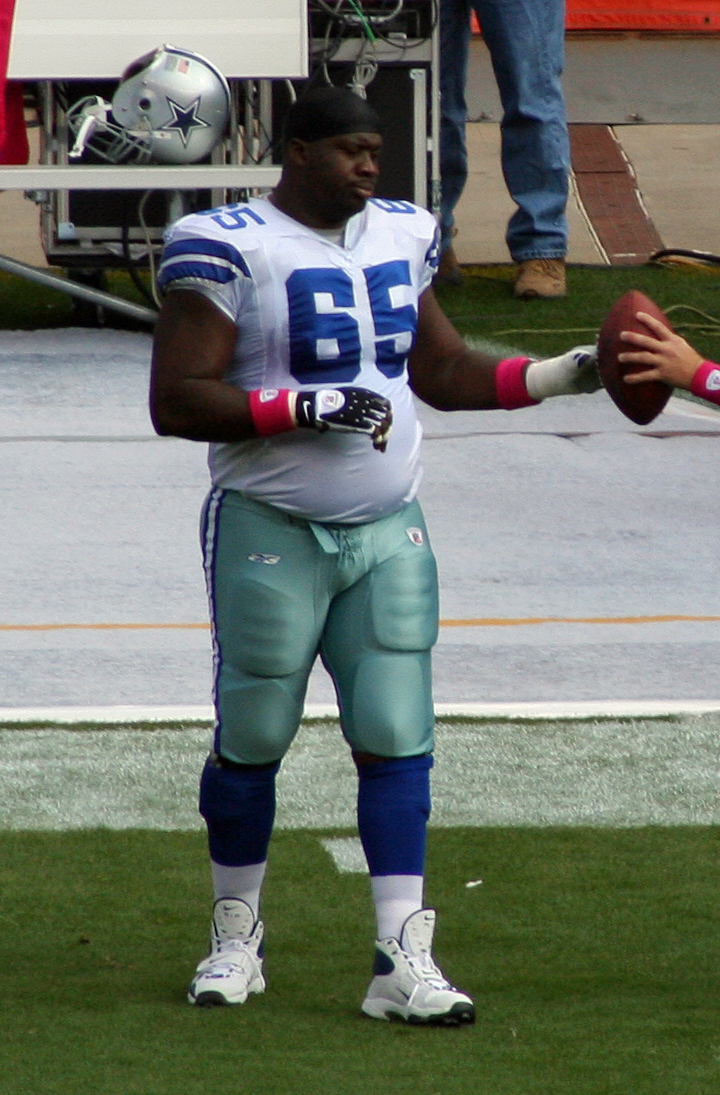
Andre Gurode

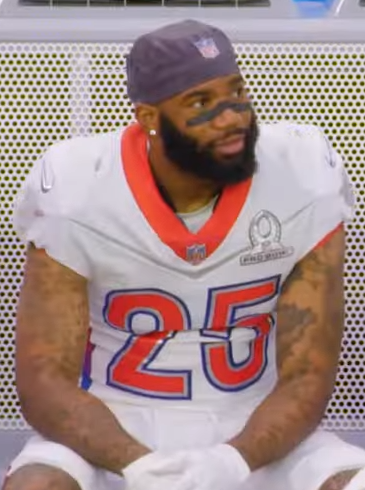
Xavien Howard

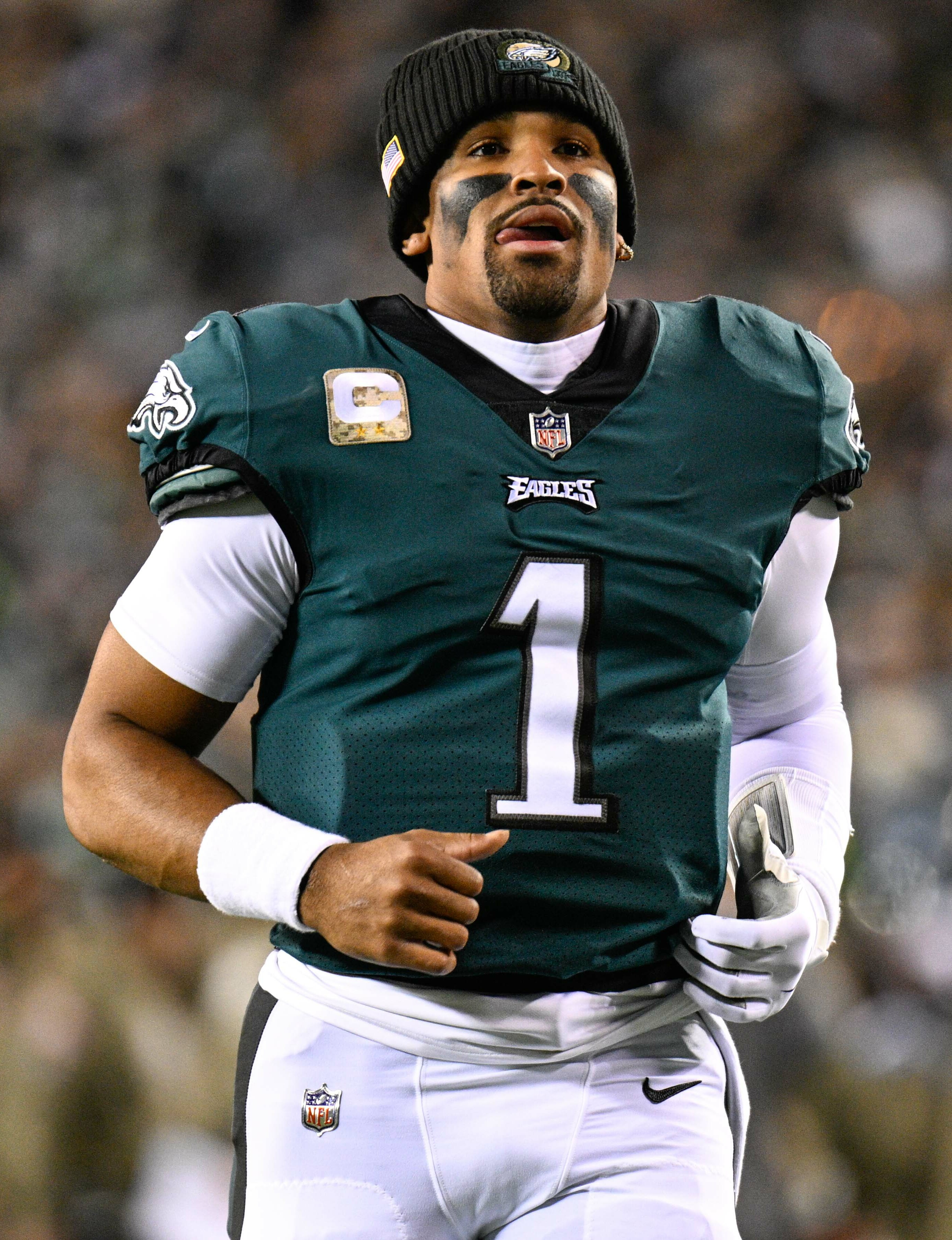
Jalen Hurts

- Taylor Gabriel (born 1991), wide receiver for Atlanta Falcons
- Dylan Gandy (born 1982), center for Detroit Lions
- Myles Garrett (born 1995), NFL defensive end for the Cleveland Browns
- Roberto Garza (born 1979), guard for Chicago Bears
- Crockett Gillmore (born 1991), tight end for Baltimore Ravens
- Chris Givens (born 1989), wide receiver for Baltimore Ravens
- Bill Glass (1935–2021), defensive end, Detroit Lions, Cleveland Browns
- Cody Glenn (born 1986), linebacker for Indianapolis Colts
- Charles Godfrey (born 1985), safety/nickelback for Carolina Panthers
- Mike Goodson (born 1987), running back/kick returner for Oakland Raiders
- Marquise Goodwin (born 1990), wide receiver, kickoff returner for Buffalo Bills
- Josh Gordon (born 1991), wide receiver for New England Patriots
- Jakeem Grant (born 1992), wide receiver for Miami Dolphins
- Darrell Green (born 1960), NFL cornerback, member of Pro Football Hall of Fame
- "Mean Joe" Greene (born 1946), College and Pro Football Hall of Fame defensive tackle for Pittsburgh Steelers
- Jabari Greer (born 1982), cornerback for New Orleans Saints
- Forrest Gregg (1933–2019), Hall of Fame offensive tackle and head coach
- Robert Griffin III (born 1990), Heisman Trophy-winning NFL quarterback
- Andre Gurode (born 1978), center for Baltimore Ravens
- Bryce Hager (born 1992), linebacker for St. Louis Rams
- Ahmard Hall (born 1979), fullback for Tennessee Titans
- Casey Hampton (born 1977), nose tackle for Pittsburgh Steelers
- Phil Handler (1908–1968), NFL football player and coach
- Geoff Hangartner (born 1982), center and guard for Carolina Panthers
- Caleb Hanie (born 1985), quarterback for Chicago Bears
- Merton Hanks (born 1968), safety for San Francisco 49ers
- James Hanna (born 1989), tight end for Dallas Cowboys
- Graham Harrell (born 1985), quarterback for the Green Bay Packers
- Tommie Harris (born 1983), defensive tackle for Chicago Bears
- Garrett Hartley (born 1986), placekicker for New Orleans Saints
- David Hawthorne (born 1985), linebacker for New Orleans Saints
- Kellen Heard (born 1985), defensive end for Buffalo Bills
- Johnnie Lee Higgins (born 1983), wide receiver for Oakland Raiders
- King Hill (1936–2012), NFL quarterback and punter
- Tony Hills (born 1984), offensive tackle for Dallas Cowboys
- Ellis Hobbs (born 1983), cornerback for Philadelphia Eagles
- Montrae Holland (born 1980), guard for Dallas Cowboys
- Ziggy Hood (born 1987), defensive end for Pittsburgh Steelers
- Rob Housler (born 1988), tight end for Arizona Cardinals
- Chris Houston (born 1984), cornerback for Atlanta Falcons
- Ken Houston (born 1944), Hall of Fame safety for Houston Oilers, Washington Redskins
- Thomas Howard (1983–2013), linebacker for Oakland Raiders
- Xavien Howard (born 1993), NFL cornerback for the Miami Dolphins
- Josh Huff (born 1991), wide receiver for Philadelphia Eagles
- Michael Huff (born 1983), free safety for Oakland Raiders
- Jerry Hughes (born 1988), defensive end for Buffalo Bills
- Byron Hunt (born 1958), linebacker for New York Giants
- Phillip Hunt (born 1986), defensive end for Philadelphia Eagles
- Kendall Hunter (born 1988), running back for San Francisco 49ers
- Sam Hurd (born 1985), wide receiver for Dallas Cowboys
- Demontre Hurst (born 1991), cornerback for Chicago Bears
- Jalen Hurts (born 1998), quarterback for the Philadelphia Eagles
- Brian Iwuh (born 1984), linebacker for Chicago Bears

J–L

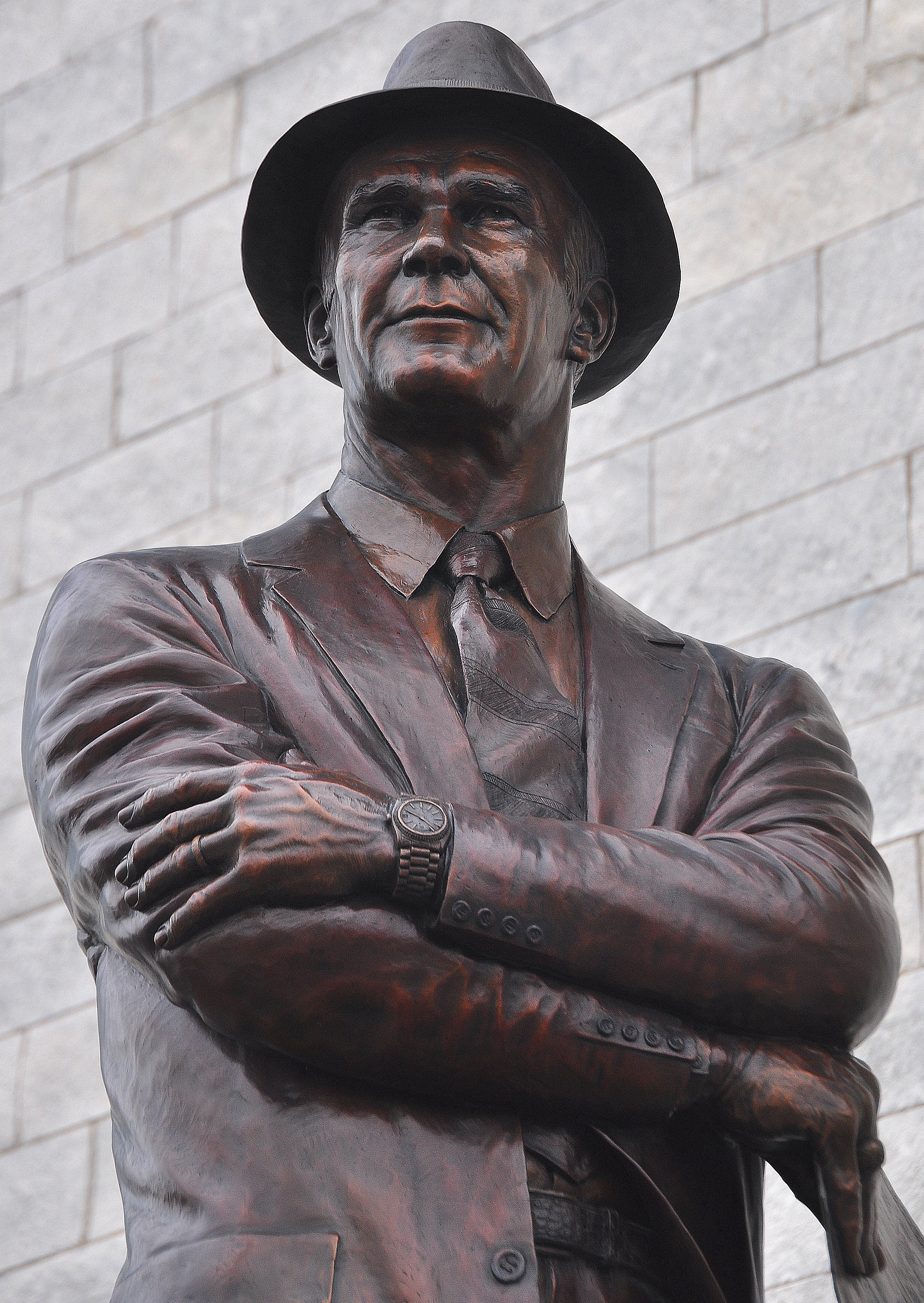
Tom Landry

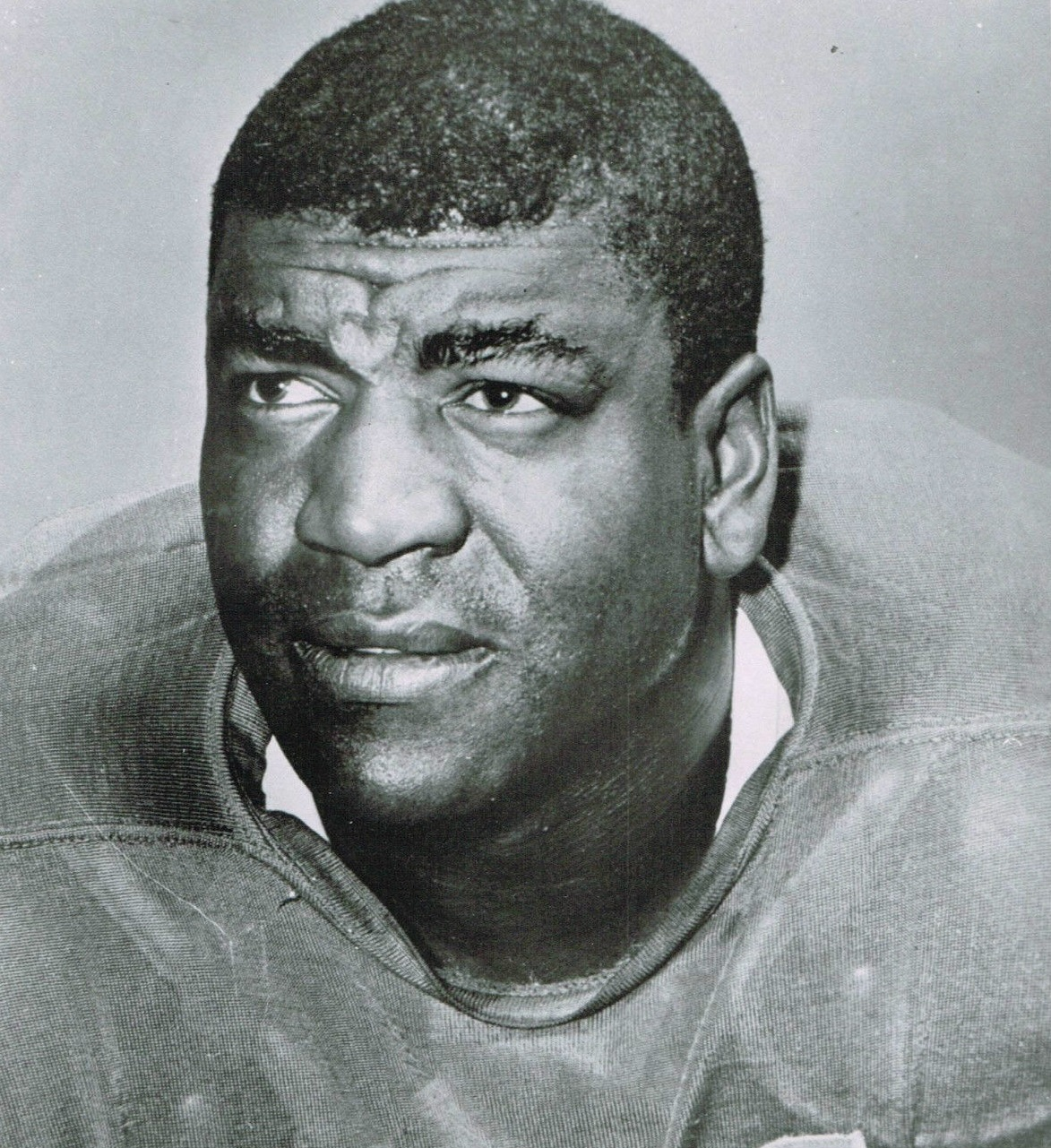
Dick "Night Train" Lane

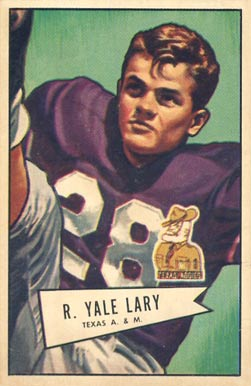
Yale Lary

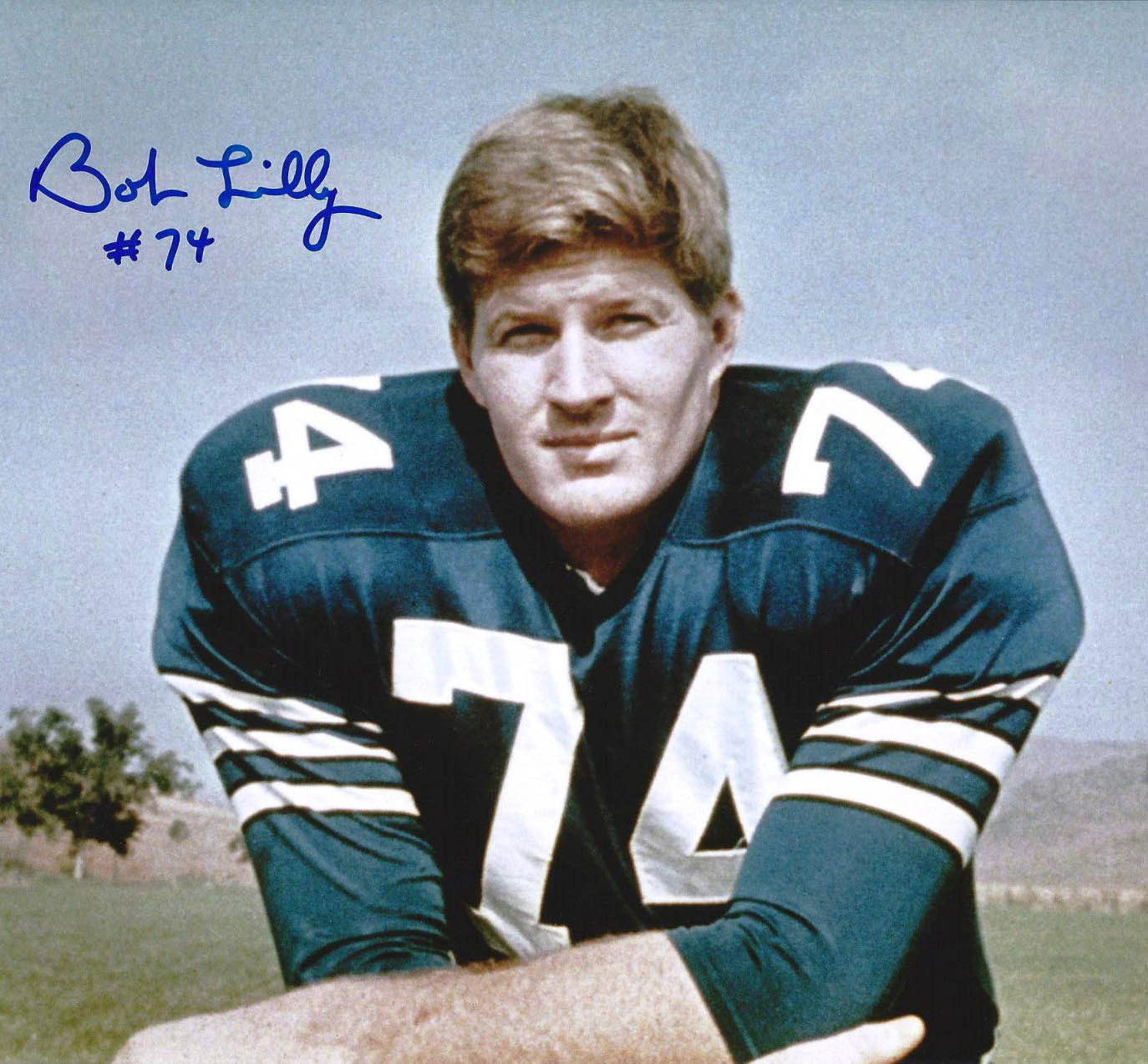
Bob Lilly

- Fred Jackson (born 1981), running back for Buffalo Bills
- Craig James (born 1961), NFL running back for the New England Patriots
- Quentin Jammer (born 1979), cornerback for San Diego Chargers
- Tony Jerod-Eddie (born 1990), defensive end for San Francisco 49ers
- Luke Joeckel (born 1991), offensive tackle for Jacksonville Jaguars
- Charlie Johnson (born 1984), offensive tackle for Indianapolis Colts
- Chris Johnson (born 1979), cornerback for Baltimore Ravens
- Derrick Johnson (born 1982), linebacker for Kansas City Chiefs
- D. J. Johnson (born 1985), cornerback for New York Giants
- Jimmy Johnson (born 1943), NCAA and NFL head coach for Dallas Cowboys and Miami Dolphins, TV personality
- Lane Johnson (born 1990), offensive tackle for Philadelphia Eagles
- Manuel Johnson (born 1986), wide receiver for Dallas Cowboys
- Michael Johnson (born 1984), safety for New York Giants
- Johnny Jolly (born 1983), defensive end for Green Bay Packers
- Aaron Jones (born 1994), NFL running back for the Green Bay Packers
- Colin Jones (born 1987), safety for Carolina Panthers
- Vi Jones (born 1998), NFL linebacker
- Zay Jones (born 1995), NFL wide receiver
- Case Keenum (born 1988), quarterback for Minnesota Vikings, Houston Texans, St. Louis/Los Angeles Rams, Denver Broncos, Washington Redskins, Cleveland Browns, Buffalo Bills
- Sergio Kindle (born 1987), linebacker for Baltimore Ravens
- David King (born 1989), defensive end for Kansas City Chiefs
- Johnny Knox (born 1986), wide receiver for Chicago Bears
- Kevin Kolb (born 1984), quarterback for Arizona Cardinals
- Gary Kubiak (born 1961), quarterback and head coach for Denver Broncos
- Jacob Lacey (born 1987), cornerback for Indianapolis Colts
- Ernie Ladd (1938–2007), college and pro football player, professional wrestler
- Brandon LaFell (born 1986), wide receiver for New England Patriots
- Tom Landry (1924–2000), Hall of Fame head coach, Dallas Cowboys
- Dick "Night Train" Lane (1927–2002), Pro Football Hall of Fame cornerback
- Jeremy Lane (born 1990), cornerback for Seattle Seahawks
- Yale Lary (1930–2017), NFL Hall of Fame defensive back, punter for Detroit Lions; politician
- Bobby Layne (1926–1986), NFL quarterback and kicker, member of College Football Hall of Fame and Pro Football Hall of Fame
- Roosevelt Leaks (born 1953), NFL running back, member of the College Football Hall of Fame
- Shane Lechler (born 1976), punter for Oakland Raiders
- Bob Lilly (born 1939), Hall of Fame defensive tackle for Dallas Cowboys
- Walker Little (born 1999), NFL offensive tackle
- Carl "Spider" Lockhart (1943–1986), defensive back for New York Giants
- P. J. Locke (born 1997), NFL safety
- Andrew Luck (born 1989), quarterback for Indianapolis Colts
- Blake Lynch (born 1997), NFL linebacker
- James Lynch (born 1999), NFL nose tackle

M–O

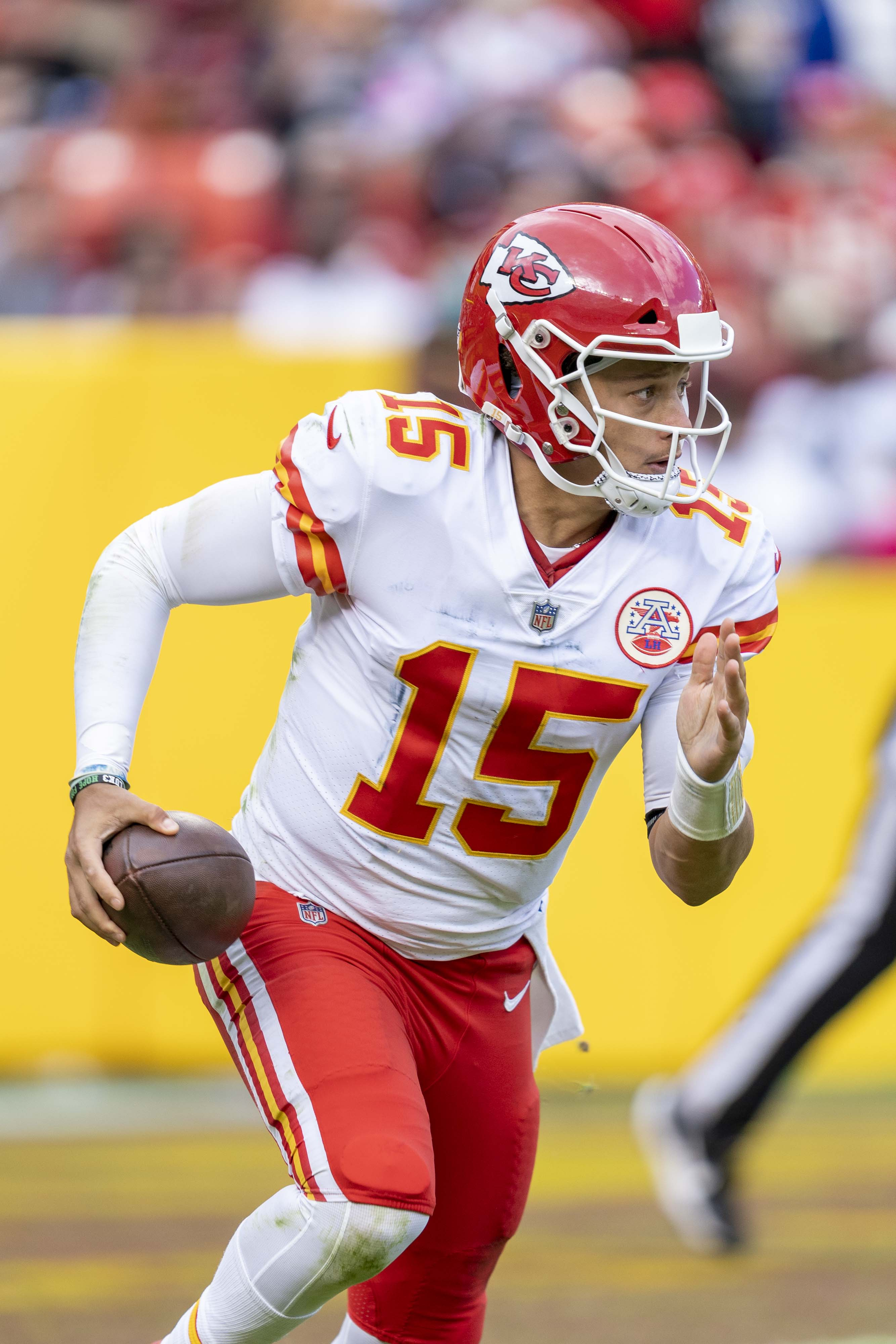
Patrick Mahomes

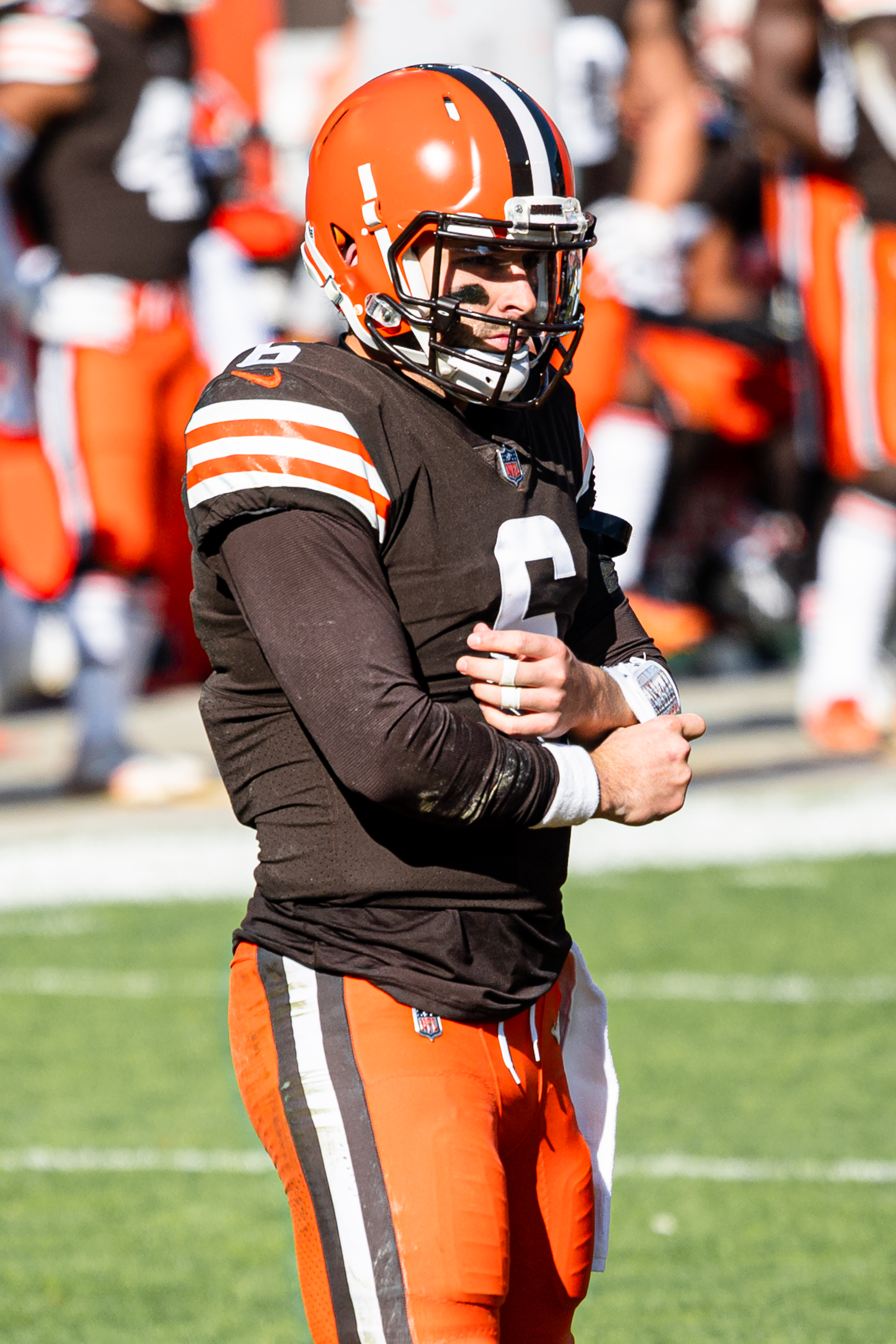
Baker Mayfield

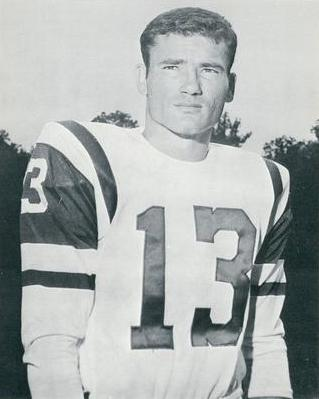
Don Maynard

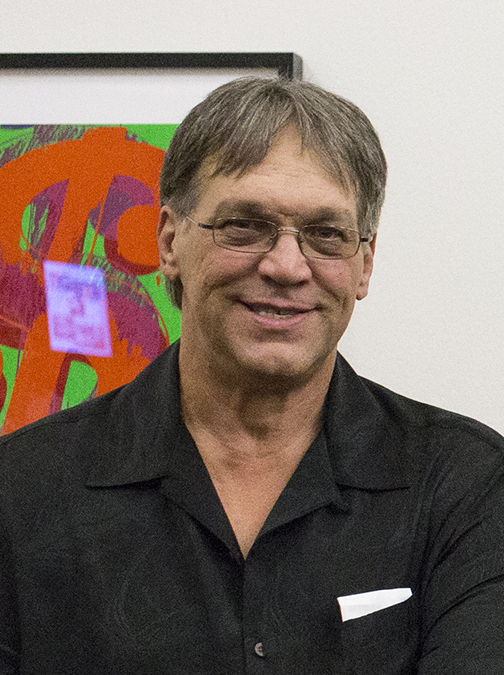
Steve McMichael

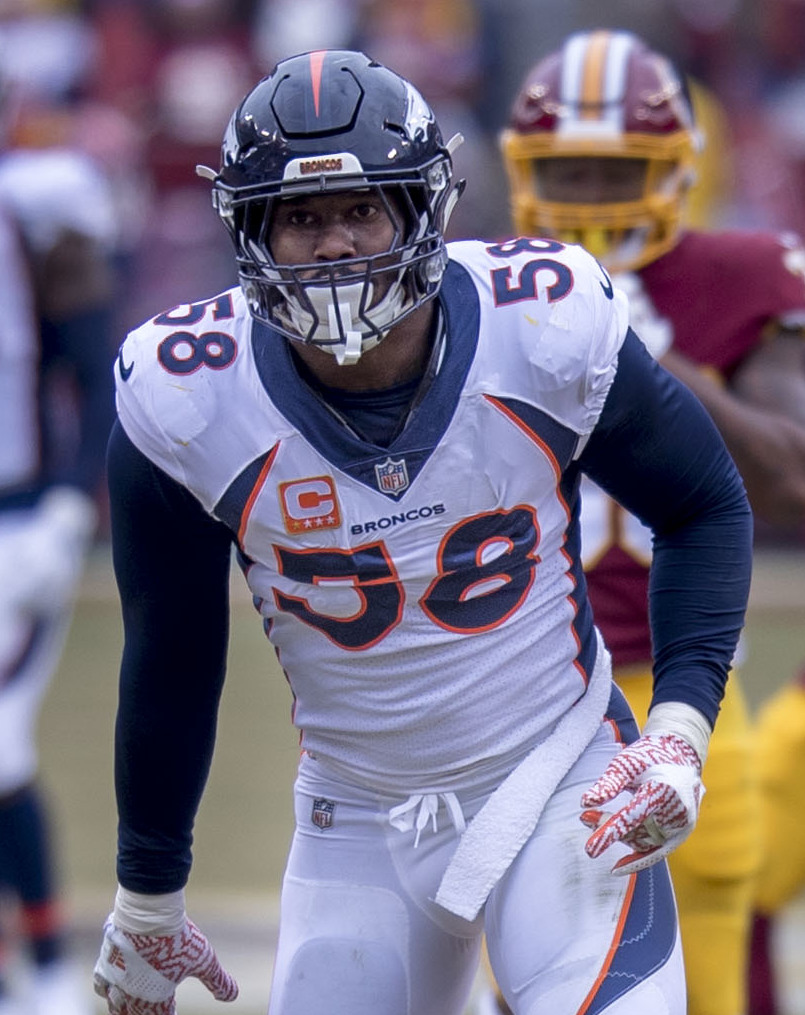
Von Miller

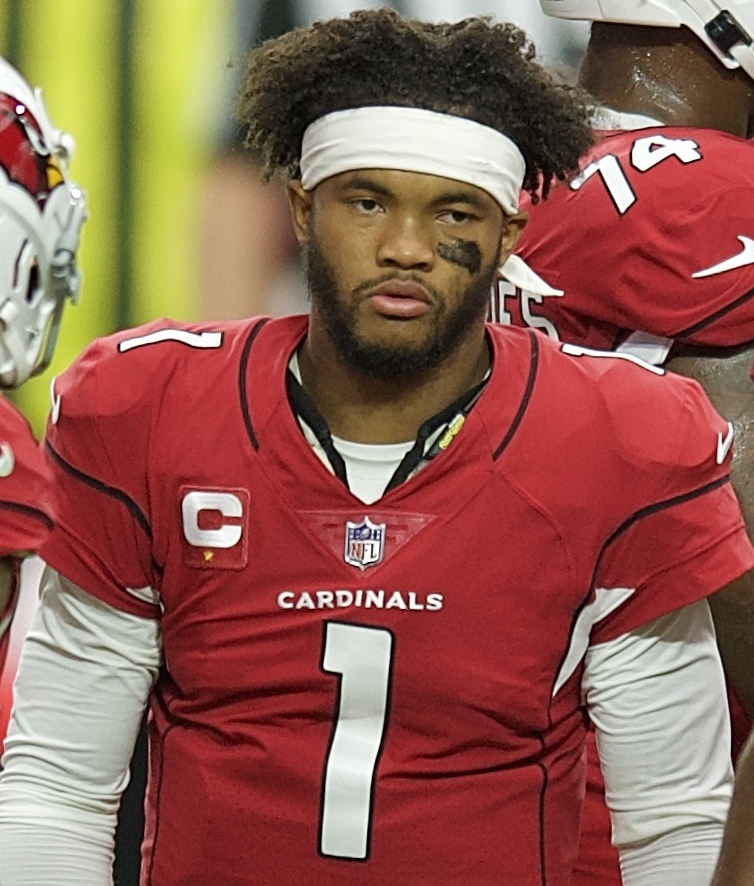
Kyler Murray

- Patrick Mahomes (born 1995), quarterback for Kansas City Chiefs
- Ryan Mallett (1988–2023), quarterback for Baltimore Ravens, New England Patriots
- Braden Mann (born 1997), NFL punter
- Danieal Manning (born 1982), free safety for Chicago Bears
- Bradley Marquez (born 1992), wide receiver for St. Louis Rams
- Ochaun Mathis (born 1999), NFL linebacker
- Ross Matiscik (born 1996), NFL long snapper
- Jake Matthews (born 1992), offensive tackle for Atlanta Falcons
- Brett Maxie (born 1962), defensive back, secondary coach for Dallas Cowboys
- Baker Mayfield (born 1995), NFL quarterback, Heisman Trophy winner
- Don Maynard (1935–2022), NFL wide receiver, member of Pro Football Hall of Fame
- Taylor Mays (born 1988), safety
- Trumaine McBride (born 1985), cornerback for New York Giants
- Brice McCain (born 1986), cornerback for Miami Dolphins
- Ryan McCollum (born 1998), NFL center
- Tristin McCollum (born 1999), NFL safety
- Zyon McCollum (born 1999), NFL cornerback
- Luke McCown (born 1981), quarterback for Atlanta Falcons
- Colt McCoy (born 1986), quarterback for Washington Redskins, Cleveland Browns
- Erik McCoy (born 1997), NFL center
- Danny McCray (born 1988), defensive back, special teamer for Dallas Cowboys
- Vance McDonald (born 1990), tight end for San Francisco 49ers
- Stephen McGee (born 1985), quarterback for Dallas Cowboys
- Steve McMichael (1957–2025), NFL defensive tackle, member of the College and Pro Football Hall of Fame
- Audray McMillian (born 1962), NFL cornerback
- Bo McMillin (1895–1952), NFL quarterback, head coach and College Football Hall of Famer
- Henry Melton (born 1986), defensive tackle for Dallas Cowboys
- "Dandy" Don Meredith (1938–2010), quarterback for Dallas Cowboys; actor and TV personality
- Christine Michael (born 1990), running back for Dallas Cowboys
- Kendre Miller (born 2002), NFL running back
- Roy Miller (born 1987), defensive tackle for Jacksonville Jaguars
- Von Miller (born 1989), outside linebacker for Denver Broncos
- Jalen Mills (born 1994), NFL safety
- Keavon Milton (born 1990), offensive lineman for Seattle Seahawks
- Marvin Mims (born 2002), NFL wide receiver
- Adonai Mitchell (born 2002), NFL wide receiver
- Earl Mitchell (born 1987), defensive tackle for Miami Dolphins
- Damontre Moore (born 1992), defensive end for New York Giants
- Dan Moore (born 1998), NFL offensive tackle
- David Moore (born 1995), NFL wide receiver
- Denarius Moore (born 1988), wide receiver for Oakland Raiders
- Mike Morgan (born 1988), linebacker for Seattle Seahawks
- Quintin Morris (born 1999), NFL tight end
- Sammy Morris (born 1977), running back for New England Patriots
- Mitch Morse (born 1992), center for Kansas City Chiefs
- Thomas Morstead (born 1986), punter for New Orleans Saints
- Marcus Murphy (born 1991), running back for New Orleans Saints
- Kyler Murray (born 1997), NFL quarterback, Heisman Trophy winner
- Dimitri Nance (born 1988), running back for Green Bay Packers
- Corey Nelson (born 1992), linebacker for Denver Broncos
- David Nelson (born 1986), wide receiver for Buffalo Bills
- Marshall Newhouse (born 1988), offensive tackle for New England Patriots
- Robert Newhouse (1950–2014), fullback for Dallas Cowboys
- Tommy Nobis (1943–2017), linebacker for Atlanta Falcons and College Football Hall of Famer
- Moran Norris (born 1978), fullback for San Francisco 49ers
- Cyril Obiozor (born 1986), linebacker for San Diego Chargers
- Alex Okafor (born 1991), linebacker for Arizona Cardinals
- Frank Okam (born 1985), defensive tackle for Houston Texans
- Russell Okung (born 1987), offensive tackle for Seattle Seahawks
- Igor Olshansky (born 1982), National Football League player
- Gunner Olszewski (born 1996), NFL wide receiver and return specialist
- Brian Orakpo (born 1986), linebacker for Washington Redskins
- Anfernee Orji (born 2000), NFL linebacker
- Zach Orr (born 1992), linebacker for Baltimore Ravens
- Kelechi Osemele (born 1989), offensive lineman for Baltimore Ravens
- DeMarvion Overshown (born 2000), NFL linebacker

P–R

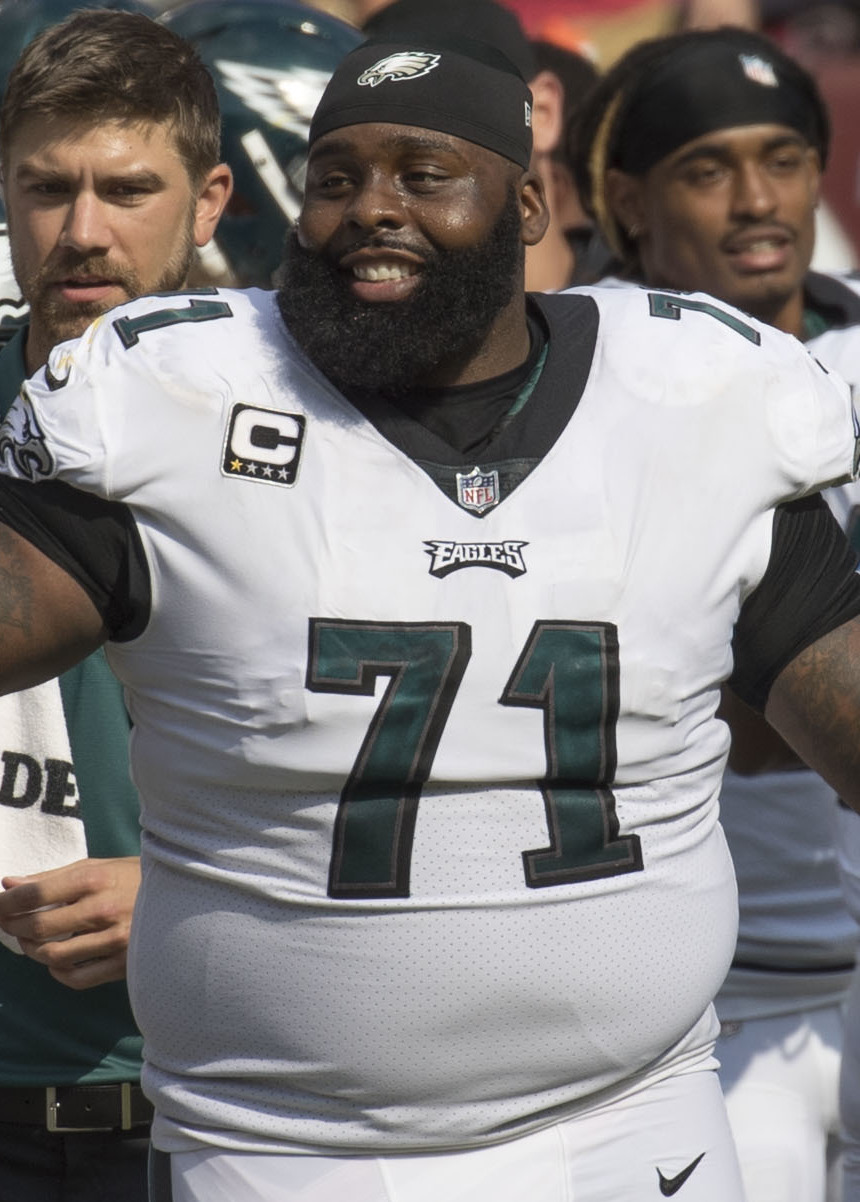
Jason Peters

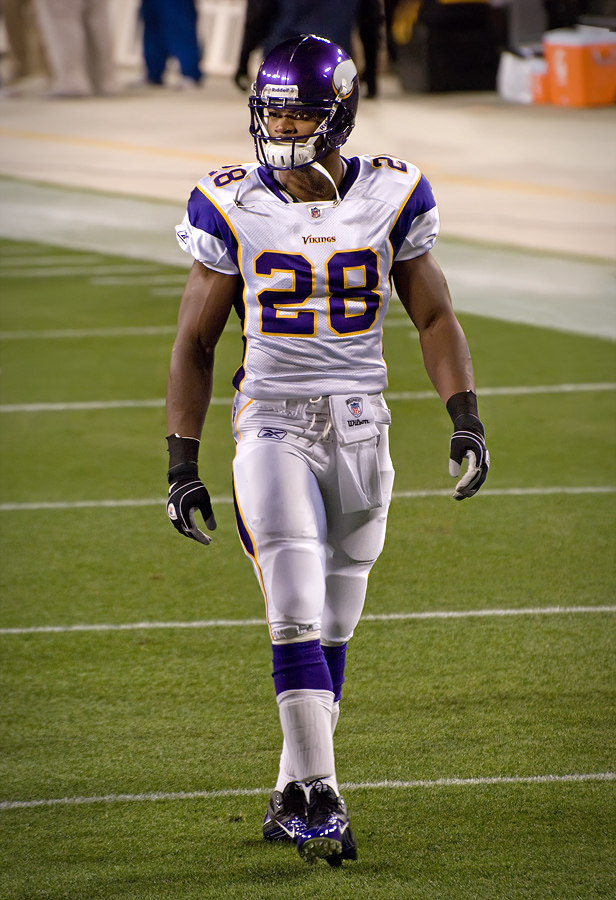
Adrian Peterson

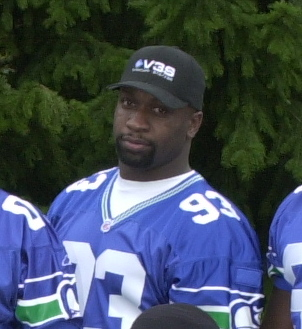
John Randle

- Juqua Parker (born 1978), defensive end for Philadelphia Eagles
- Tyler Patmon (born 1991), cornerback for Dallas Cowboys
- Elvis Patterson (born 1960), NFL defensive back
- Charlie Peprah (born 1983), safety for Green Bay Packers
- Mac Percival (born 1940), placekicker for Dallas Cowboys and Chicago Bears
- Jason Peters (born 1982), offensive tackle for Philadelphia Eagles
- Adrian Peterson (born 1985), NFL running back for Minnesota Vikings and other teams
- Brandon Pettigrew (born 1985), tight end for Detroit Lions
- Bum Phillips (1923–2013), NFL head coach of Houston Oilers, New Orleans Saints
- Wade Phillips (born 1947), defensive coordinator of Los Angeles Rams, head coach of Denver Broncos, Buffalo Bills, Dallas Cowboys
- Christian Ponder (born 1988), quarterback for Minnesota Vikings
- John Randle (born 1967), NFL defensive tackle, member of the Pro Football Hall of Fame
- Manny Ramirez (born 1983), guard/center for Denver Broncos
- Jalen Reagor (born 1999), NFL wide receiver and return specialist
- Gary Reasons (born 1962), linebacker, primarily for New York Giants
- Cory Redding (born 1980), defensive end for Indianapolis Colts
- Josh Reynolds (born 1995), NFL wide receiver
- Demani Richardson (born 2000), NFL safety
- Weston Richburg (born 1991), offensive lineman for New York Giants
- Lincoln Riley (born 1983), head coach of the Oklahoma Sooners and USC Trojans
- Elandon Roberts (born 1994), linebacker for New England Patriots
- Aldrick Robinson (born 1988), wide receiver for Atlanta Falcons
- A'Shawn Robinson (born 1995), NFL defensive end
- Khiry Robinson (born 1989), running back for New Orleans Saints
- Layden Robinson (born 2001), NFL offensive guard
- Bradley Roby (born 1992), cornerback for Denver Broncos
- Jacquizz Rodgers (born 1990), running back for Atlanta Falcons
- Shaun Rogers (born 1979), defensive tackle for New Orleans Saints
- Aaron Ross (born 1982), cornerback for Jacksonville Jaguars
- Kyle Rote (1928–2002), All-American running back at SMU, NFL New York Giants wide receiver
- Stanford Routt (born 1983), NFL cornerback
- Eric Rowe (born 1992), cornerback for New England Patriots
- Ryan Russell (born 1992), defensive end for Dallas Cowboys
- Jon Runyan Jr. (born 1997), NFL offensive guard

S–T

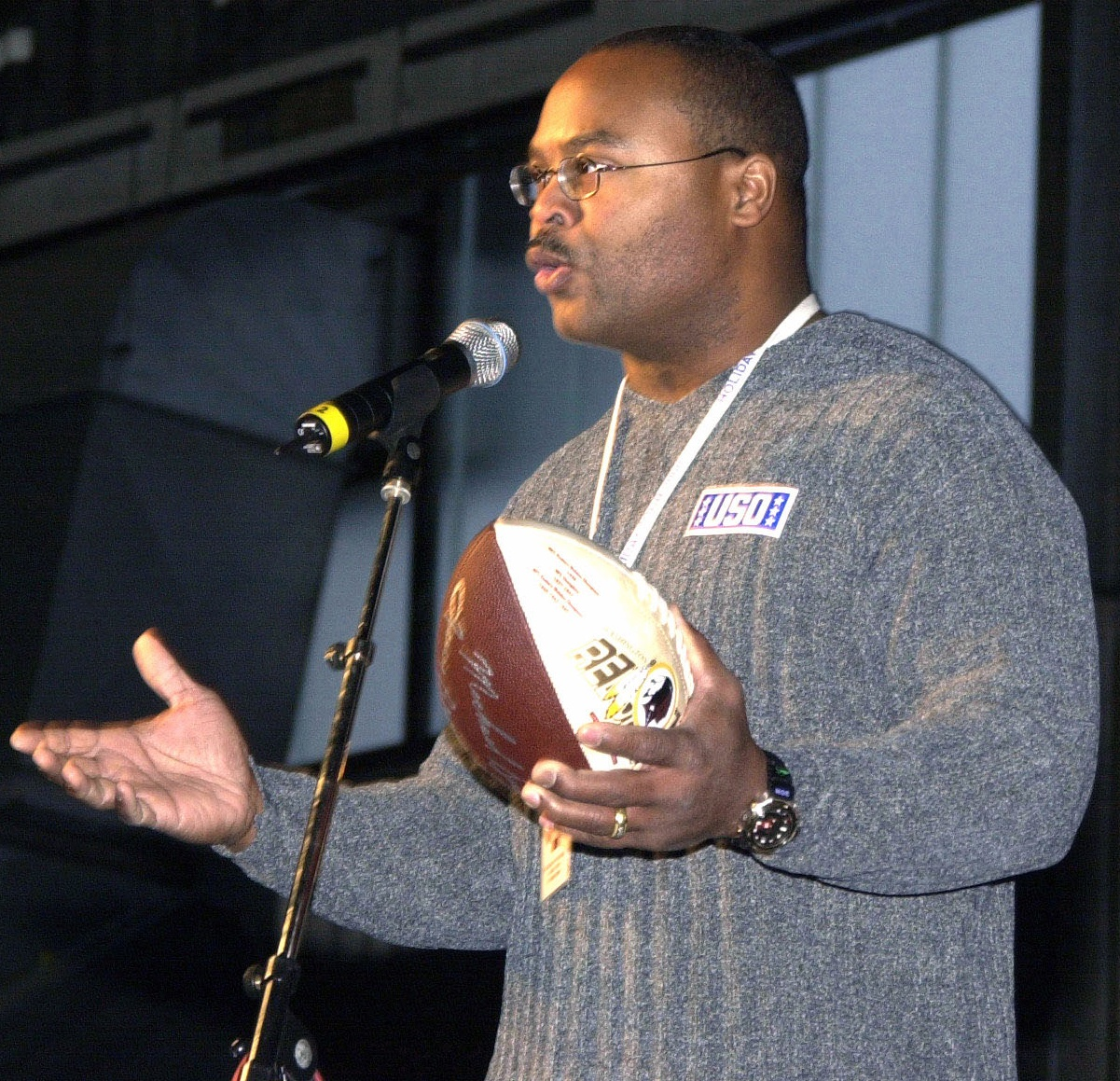
Mike Singletary

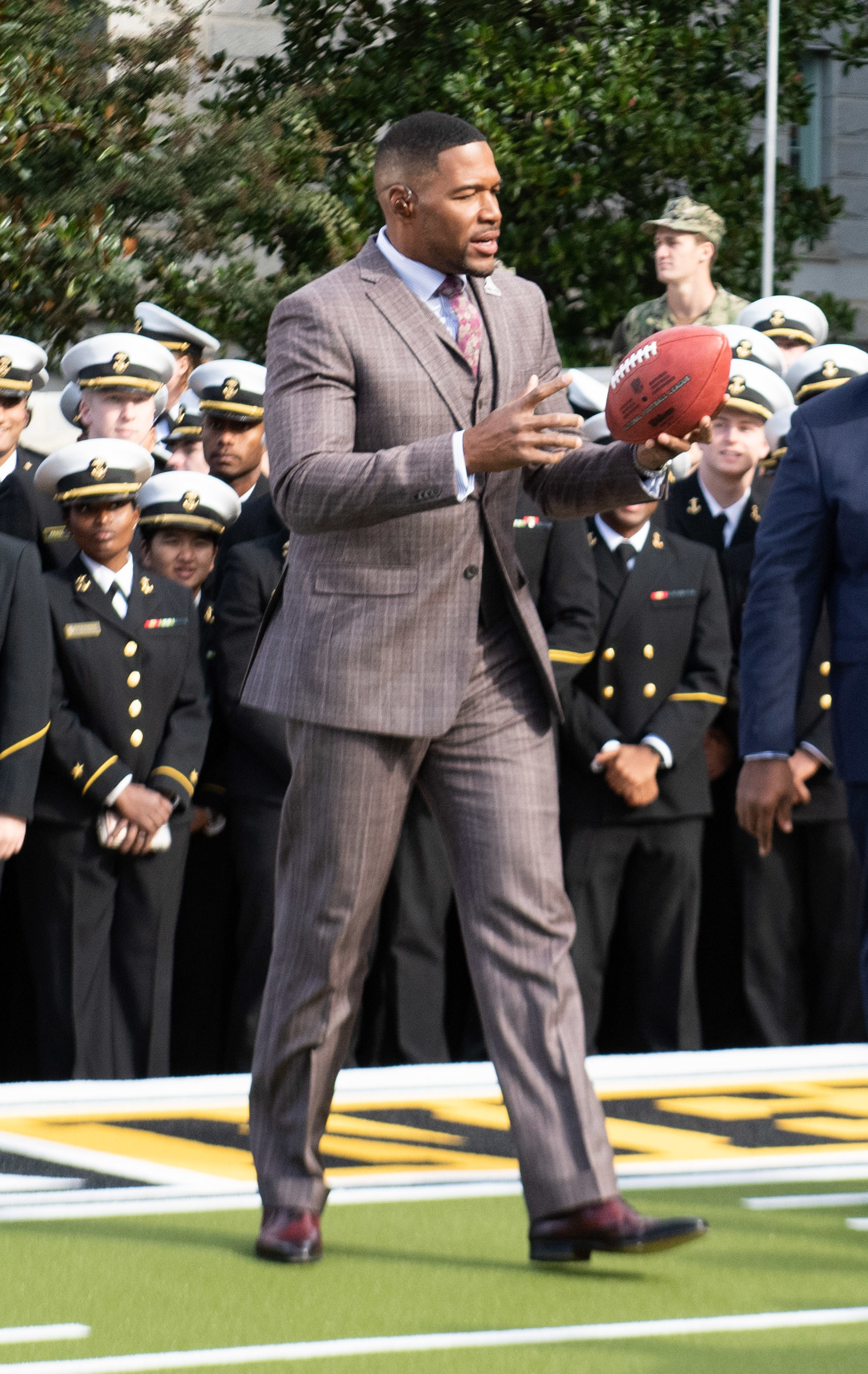
Michael Strahan

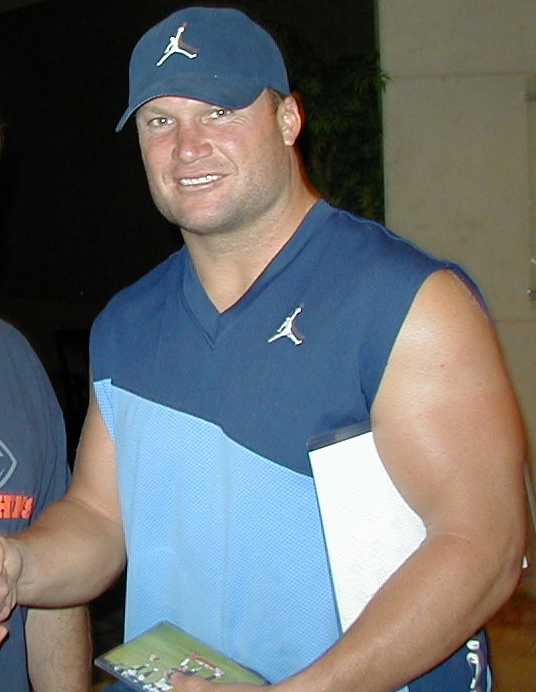
Zach Thomas

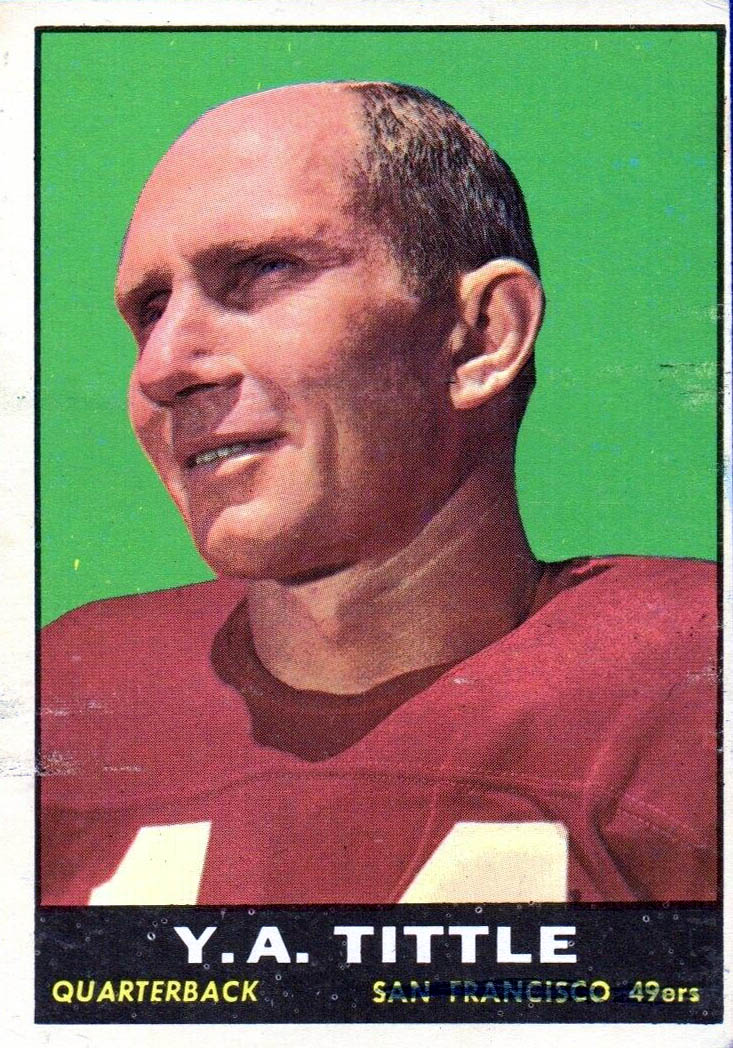
Y. A. Tittle

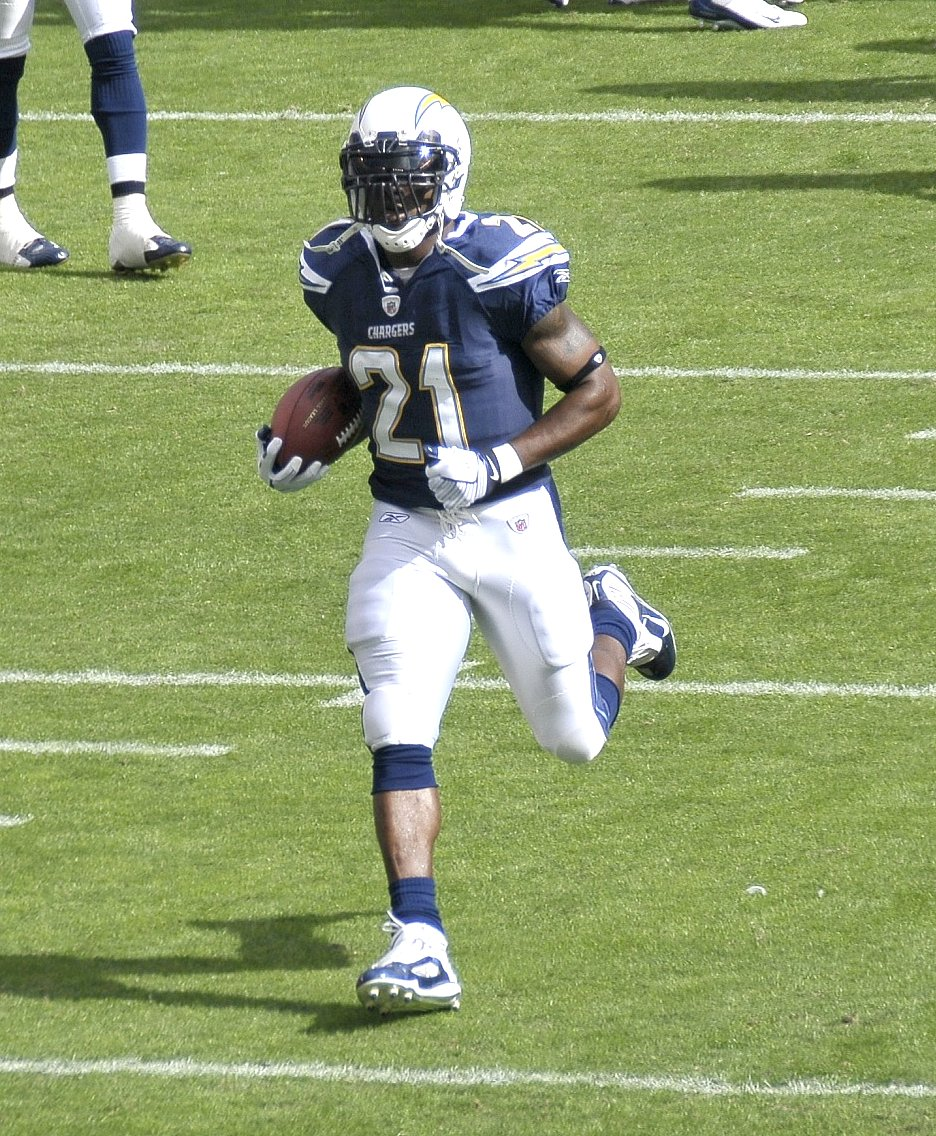
LaDainian Tomlinson

- Emmanuel Sanders (born 1987), wide receiver for Denver Broncos
- Josh Scobee (born 1982), placekicker for Jacksonville Jaguars
- Jonathan Scott (born 1983), offensive tackle for Pittsburgh Steelers
- Derrick Shelby (born 1989), defensive end for Miami Dolphins
- Del Shofner (1934–2020), wide receiver for New York Giants, Los Angeles Rams; MVP of 1957 Sugar Bowl
- Ozzie Simmons (1914–2001), one of first black All-American players in 1930s
- Mike Singletary (born 1958), NFL player and coach, member of the College and Pro Football Hall of Fame
- John Skelton (born 1988), quarterback for Arizona Cardinals
- Rashawn Slater (born 1999), offensive tackle for Los Angeles Chargers
- Bubba Smith (1945–2011), defensive end with Baltimore Colts, Oakland Raiders, Houston Oilers and actor
- Hunter Smith (born 1977), punter for Washington Redskins
- Kevin Smith (born 1970), cornerback for Dallas Cowboys
- Lovie Smith (born 1958), head coach for Chicago Bears, Tampa Bay Buccaneers, University of Illinois
- Wade Smith (born 1981), guard and center for Houston Texans
- Justin Snow (born 1976), long snapper for Indianapolis Colts
- E. J. Speed (born 1995), NFL linebacker
- Matthew Stafford (born 1988), quarterback for Detroit Lions, Los Angeles Rams
- Terence Steele (born 1997), offensive tackle for Dallas Cowboys
- Brandon Stephens (born 1997), cornerback for the Baltimore Ravens
- Jarrett Stidham (born 1996), quarterback for New England Patriots
- Matt Stover (born 1968), placekicker for Indianapolis Colts
- Michael Strahan (born 1971), Hall of Fame defensive end for New York Giants; TV personality, Good Morning America, NFL on FOX, The $100,000 Pyramid
- Grant Stuard (born 1998), NFL linebacker
- Ty Summers (born 1995), NFL linebacker
- Courtland Sutton (born 1995), cornerback for Denver Broncos
- Travis Swanson (born 1991), center for Detroit Lions
- Aqib Talib (born 1986), cornerback for Tampa Bay Buccaneers
- Ryan Tannehill (born 1988), quarterback for Miami Dolphins, Tennessee Titans
- Phillip Tanner (born 1988), running back for Dallas Cowboys
- Charley Taylor (1941–2022), NFL wide receiver, member of Pro Football Hall of Fame
- Patrick Taylor (born 1998), NFL running back
- Stepfan Taylor (born 1991), running back for Arizona Cardinals
- David Thomas (born 1983), tight end for New Orleans Saints
- Earl Thomas (born 1989), safety for Seattle Seahawks
- Michael Thomas (born 1989), safety for Miami Dolphins
- Mike Thomas (born 1987), wide receiver for Jacksonville Jaguars
- Thurman Thomas (born 1966), NFL running back, member of the College Football Hall of Fame and Pro Football Hall of Fame
- Zach Thomas (born 1973), NFL linebacker, member of the College Football Hall of Fame and Pro Football Hall of Fame
- Ted Thompson (1953–2021), general manager of Green Bay Packers
- Tom Thompson (born 1948), oldest football player in NCAA history
- Y. A. Tittle (1926–2017), Hall of Fame quarterback, primarily with San Francisco 49ers, New York Giants
- LaDainian Tomlinson (born 1979), NFL running back and College Football Hall of Famer
- Michael Toudouze (born 1983), offensive tackle for Indianapolis Colts
- Nick Thurman (born 1995), NFL defensive tackle
- Austin Trammell (born 1998), NFL wide receiver
- Kyle Trask (born 1998), NFL quarterback
- Orville Trask (1934–2008), NFL defensive tackle
- Jeremiah Trotter (born 1977), linebacker for Philadelphia Eagles
- Winfred Tubbs (born 1970), NFL linebacker
- Jason Tucker (born 1976), NFL wide receiver
- Justin Tucker (born 1989), placekicker for Baltimore Ravens
- Clayton Tune (born 1999), NFL quarterback
- Bulldog Turner (1919–1998), Hall of Fame center and linebacker for Chicago Bears
- Rob Turner (born 1984), former NFL player
- Payton Turner (born 1999), NFL defensive end

U–Z

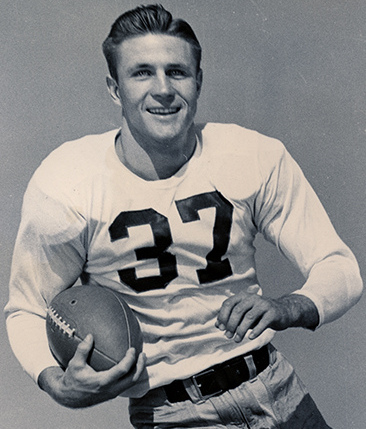
Doak Walker

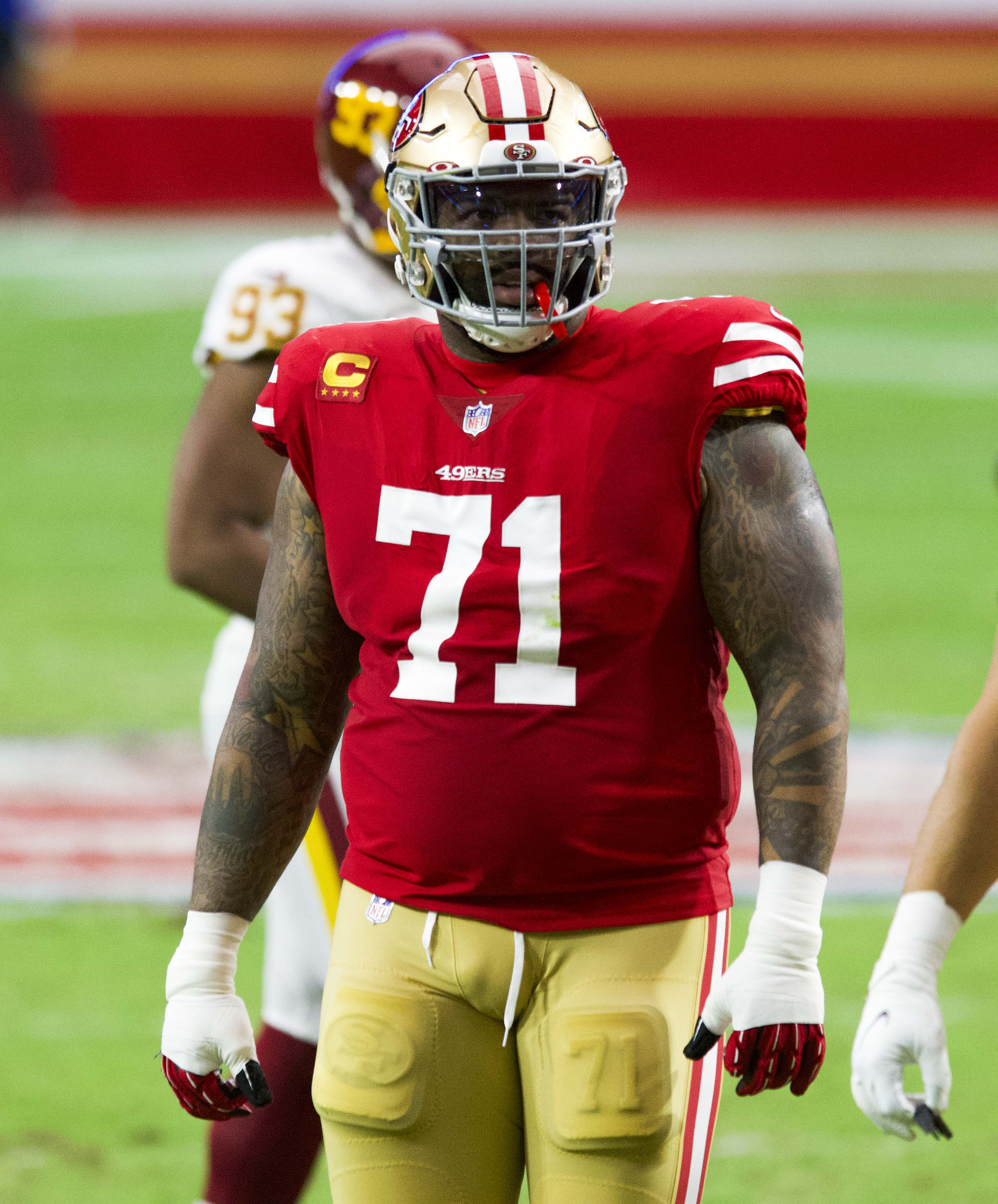
Trent Williams

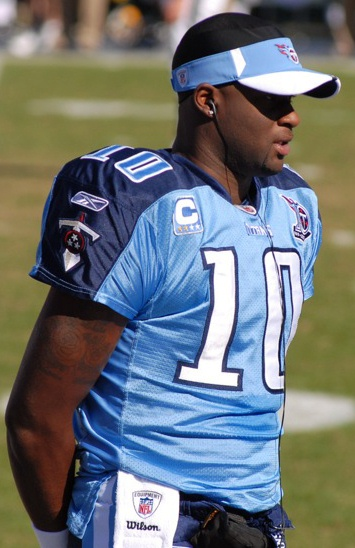
Vince Young

- Tony Ugoh (born 1983), offensive tackle for Indianapolis Colts
- Gene Upshaw (1945–2008), Hall of Fame guard for Oakland Raiders
- Kenny Vaccaro (born 1991), safety for New Orleans Saints
- Louis Vasquez (born 1987), offensive guard for Denver Broncos
- Dustin Vaughan (born 1991), quarterback for Dallas Cowboys
- Lawrence Vickers (born 1983), fullback for Dallas Cowboys
- Trevin Wade (born 1989), cornerback for New York Giants
- Jaylen Waddle (born 1998), wide receiver for Miami Dolphins
- LaAdrian Waddle (born 1991), offensive tackle for New England Patriots
- Doak Walker (1927–1998), College and Hall of Fame player for SMU and Detroit Lions, winner of Heisman Trophy
- Jamar Wall (born 1988), cornerback for Philadelphia Eagles
- J. D. Walton (born 1987), center for New York Giants
- John Washington (born 1963), defensive end for New York Giants
- Brian Waters (born 1977), offensive guard for New England Patriots
- Armani Watts (born 1996), safety for Kansas City Chiefs
- J'Marcus Webb (born 1988), offensive tackle for Chicago Bears
- Richmond Webb (born 1967), NFL offensive tackle for the Miami Dolphins and Cincinnati Bengals
- Sean Weatherspoon (born 1987), linebacker for Arizona Cardinals
- Scott Wells (born 1981), center for St. Louis Rams
- DeAndrew White (born 1991), wide receiver for San Francisco 49ers
- Melvin White (born 1990), cornerback for Carolina Panthers
- Nikita Whitlock (born 1991), fullback for New York Giants
- Fozzy Whittaker (born 1989), running back, kick returner, Carolina Panthers
- Aaron Williams (born 1990), safety for Buffalo Bills
- Bobbie Williams (born 1976), guard for Baltimore Ravens
- Brandon Williams (born 1986), linebacker for Dallas Cowboys
- Brian Williams (born 1972), NFL linebacker
- Byron Williams (born 1960), NFL and WLAF wide receiver
- Connor Williams (born 1997), offensive guard for the Dallas Cowboys
- Daryl Williams (born 1992), offensive tackle for Carolina Panthers
- D. J. Williams (born 1988), tight end for Green Bay Packers
- Malcolm Williams (born 1987), defensive back for New England Patriots
- Roy Williams (born 1981), wide receiver for Dallas Cowboys
- Teddy Williams (born 1988), cornerback for Carolina Panthers
- Terrance Williams (born 1989), wide receiver for Dallas Cowboys
- Trent Williams (born 1988), offensive tackle for Washington Redskins, San Francisco 49ers
- Josh Wilson (born 1985), cornerback for Atlanta Falcons
- Wade Wilson (1959–2019), quarterback for Minnesota Vikings; quarterbacks coach for Dallas Cowboys
- Eric Winston (born 1983), offensive tackle for Houston Texans
- Will Witherspoon (born 1980), linebacker for Tennessee Titans
- Kendall Wright (born 1989), wide receiver for the Chicago Bears
- Vince Young (born 1983), quarterback for Texas Longhorns and Philadelphia Eagles, MVP of 2005 and 2006 Rose Bowl

=== Golf ===
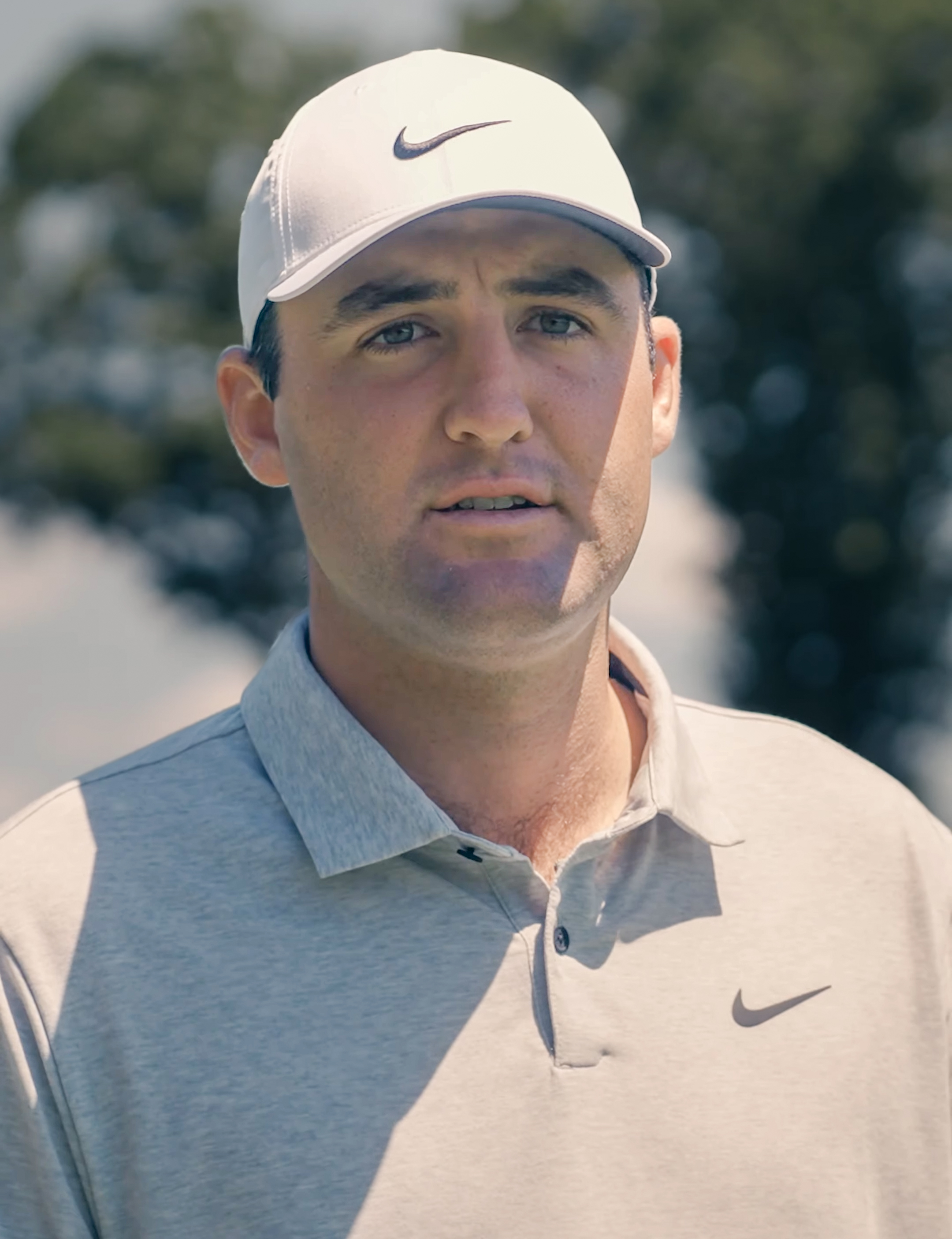
Scottie Scheffler

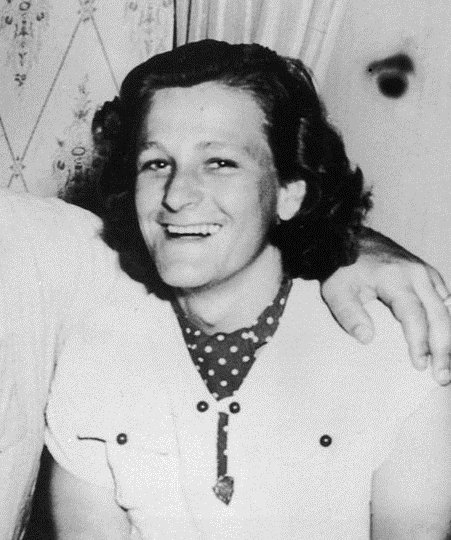
Babe Didrikson Zaharias

- Rich Beem (born 1970), professional golfer
- Jack Burke Jr. (1923–2024), professional golfer
- Harry Cooper (1904–2000), professional golfer
- Bettye Danoff (1923–2011), golfer, one of founding members of LPGA
- Lee Elder (1934–2021), golfer, first African American to play in the Masters Tournament
- Ben Hogan (1912–1997), golfer
- Betty Jameson (1919–2009), golfer
- Tom Kite (born 1949), golfer
- Justin Leonard (born 1972), golfer
- Byron Nelson (1912–2006), professional golfer
- Corey Pavin (born 1959), professional golfer
- Harvey Penick (1904–1995), golfer, golf coach, elected to World Golf Hall of Fame
- Scottie Scheffler (born 1996), golfer
- Jordan Spieth (born 1993), golfer, achieved No. 1 world ranking at age 22
- Lee Trevino (born 1939), golfer
- Kathy Whitworth (1939–2022), golfer in World Golf Hall of Fame
- Dave Williams (1918–1998), golf coach at the University of Houston, which he led to 16 team national championships
- Babe Didrikson Zaharias (1911–1956), athlete, won 82 amateur and professional golf tournaments, including five major professional championships
- Will Zalatoris (born 1996), golfer

=== Motorsports ===
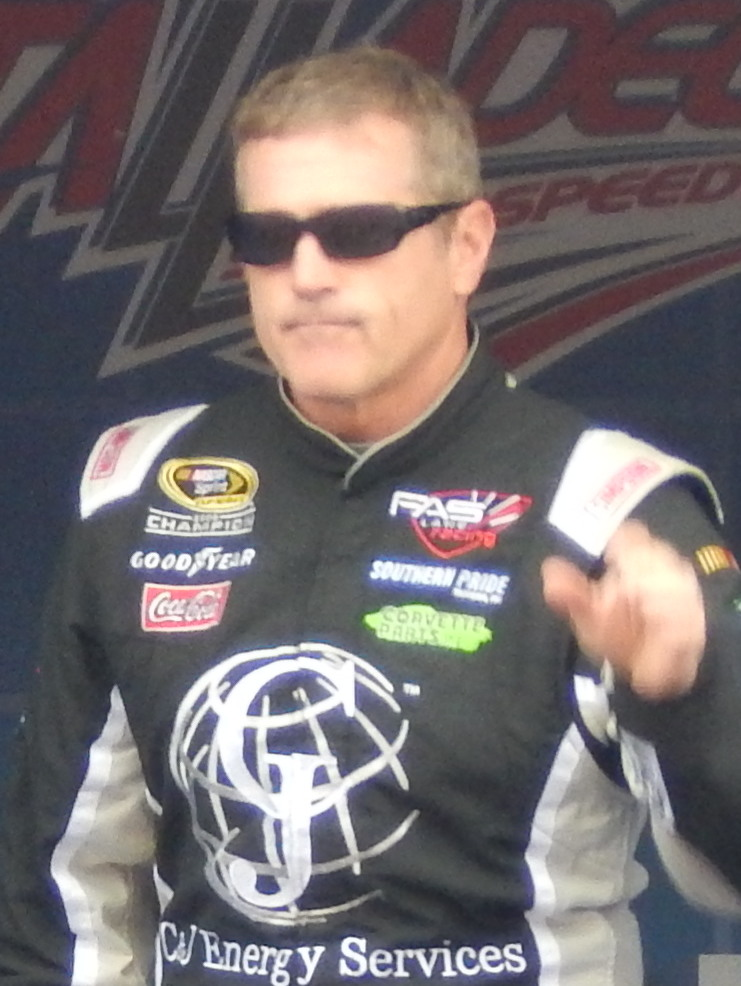
Bobby Labonte

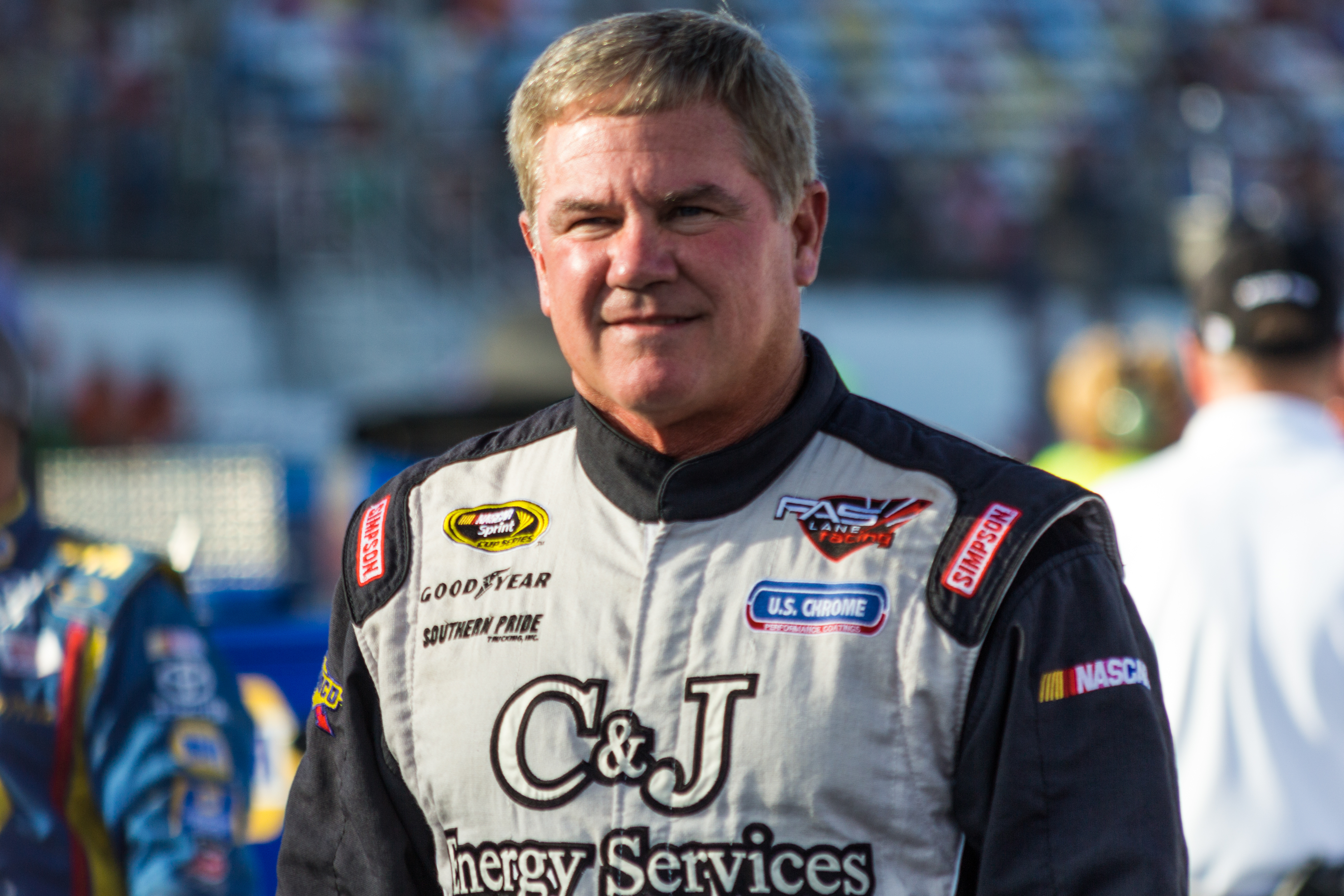
Terry Labonte

- Brandon Bernstein (born 1972) drag racer, NHRA top fuel driver, son of Kenny Bernstein
- Kenny Bernstein (born 1944), drag racer, six-time NHRA champion, father of Brandon Bernstein
- Chris Buescher (born 1992), NASCAR driver
- James Buescher (born 1990), former NASCAR driver
- Colin Braun (born 1988), professional race car driver
- Joie Chitwood (1912–1988), professional race car driver
- Brad Coleman (born 1988), former NASCAR driver
- Stuart Crow (born 1959), race car driver
- Bayley Currey (born 1996), NASCAR driver
- Trenton Estep (born 1999), race car driver
- A. J. Foyt (born 1935), race car driver
- Jesse Iwuji (born 1987), NASCAR driver
- Bobby Labonte (born 1964), NASCAR driver, 2000 Winston Cup Champion, younger brother of Terry Labonte
- Terry Labonte (born 1956), NASCAR driver, NASCAR Hall of Fame inductee, 1996 Winston Cup Champion
- Carroll Shelby (1923–2012), race car driver and designer of the Shelby Cobra and other automobiles
- David Starr (born 1967), NASCAR driver

=== Professional wrestling ===
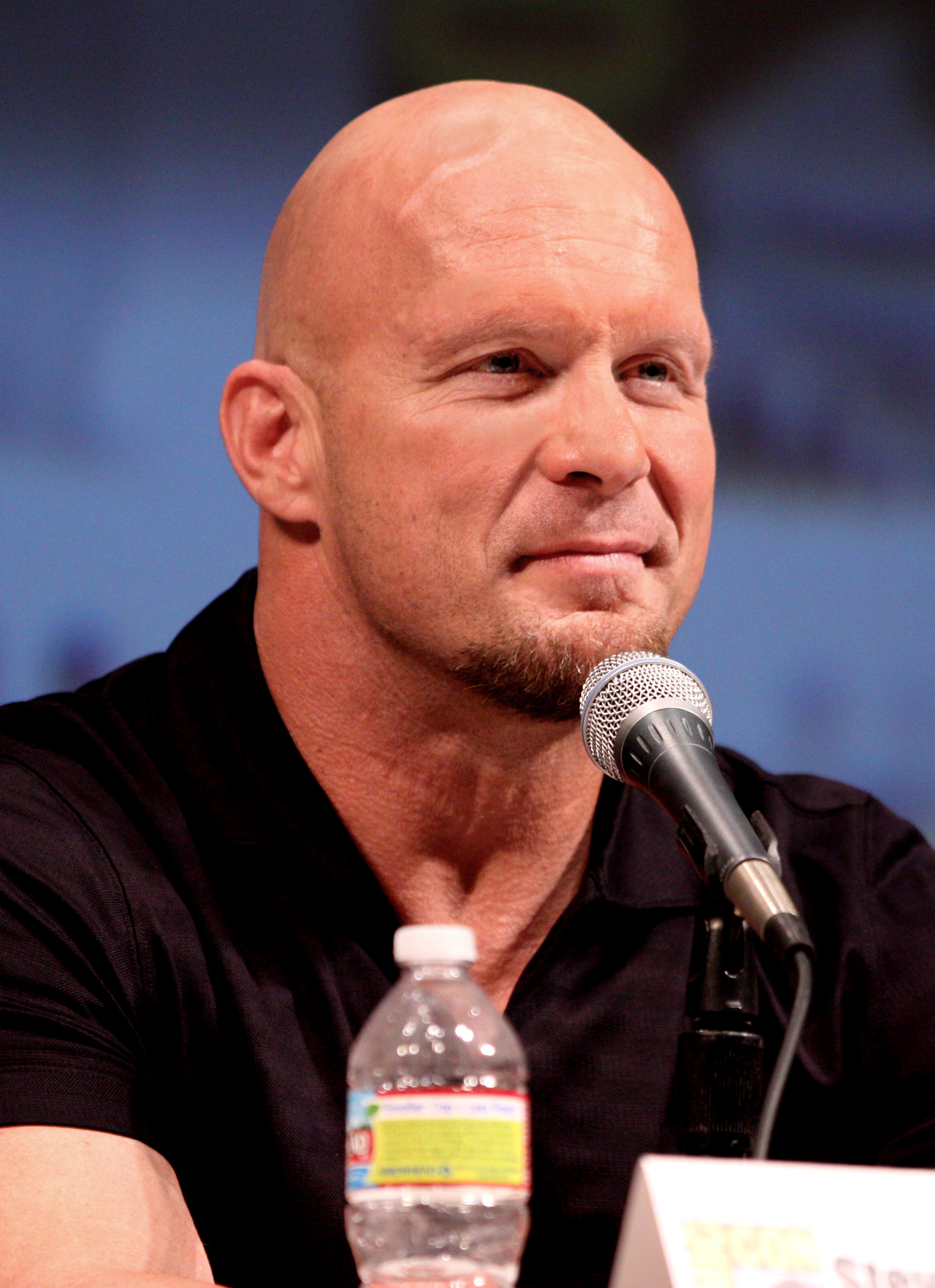
Stone Cold Steve Austin

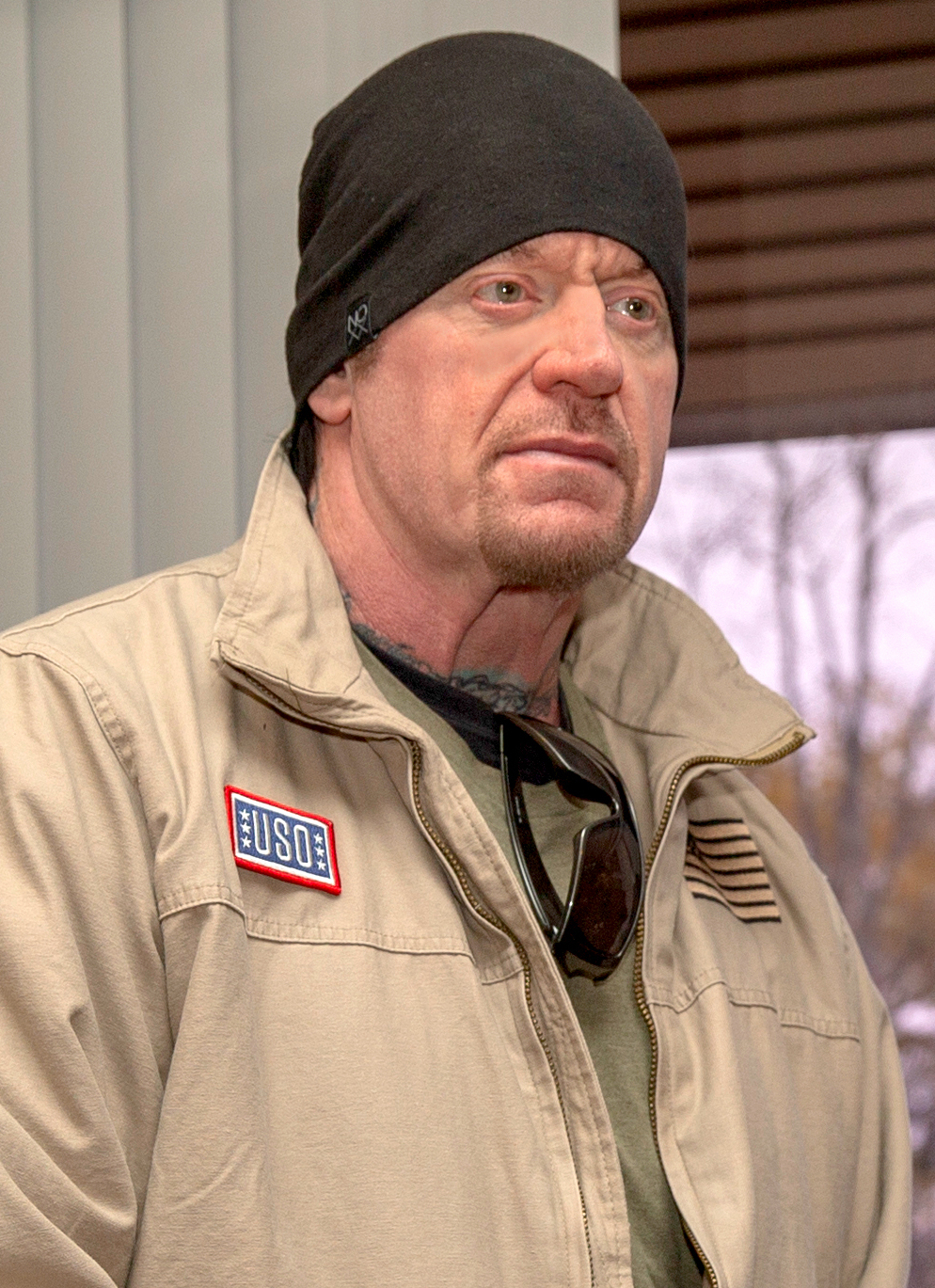
Mark Calaway "The Undertaker"

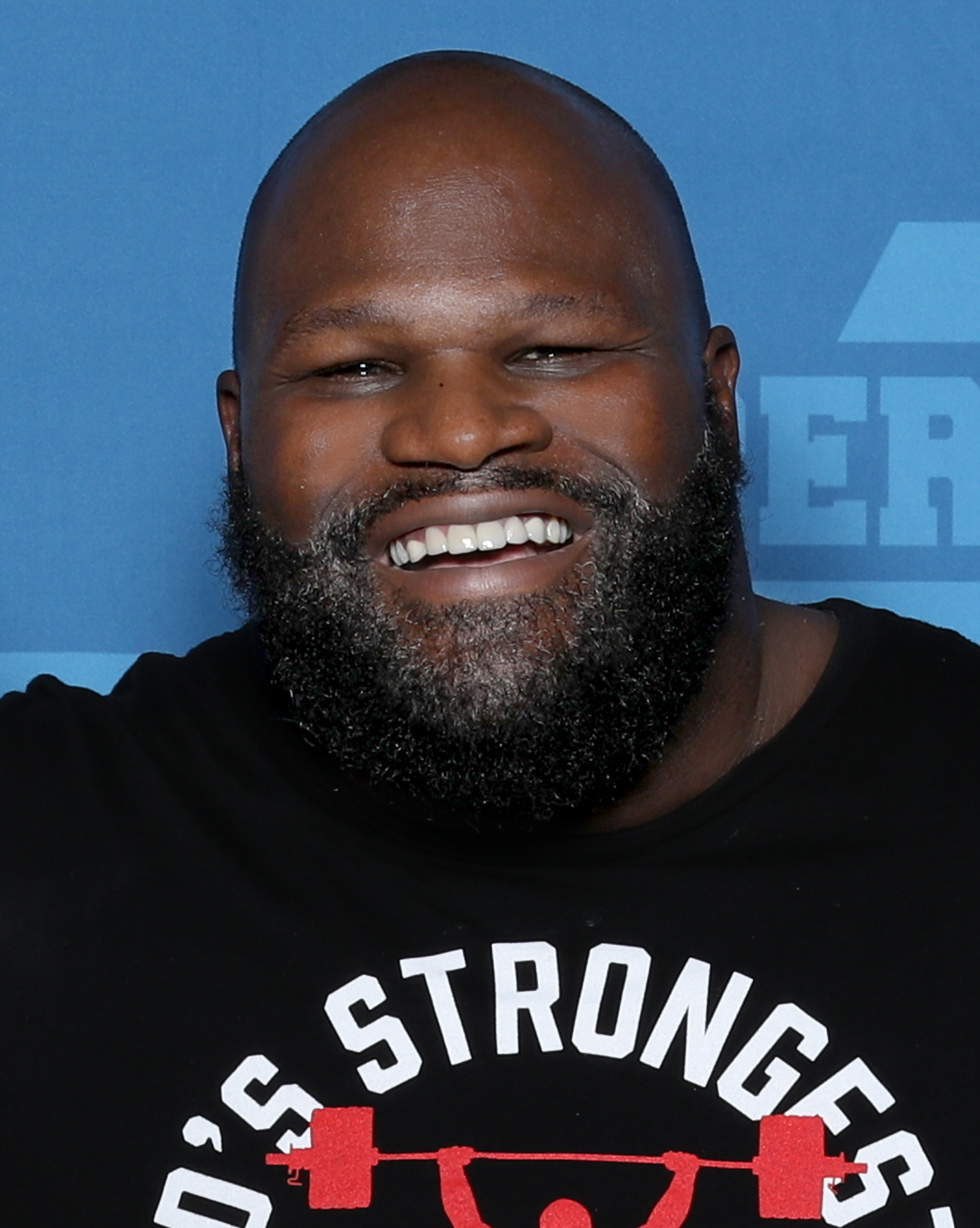
Mark Henry

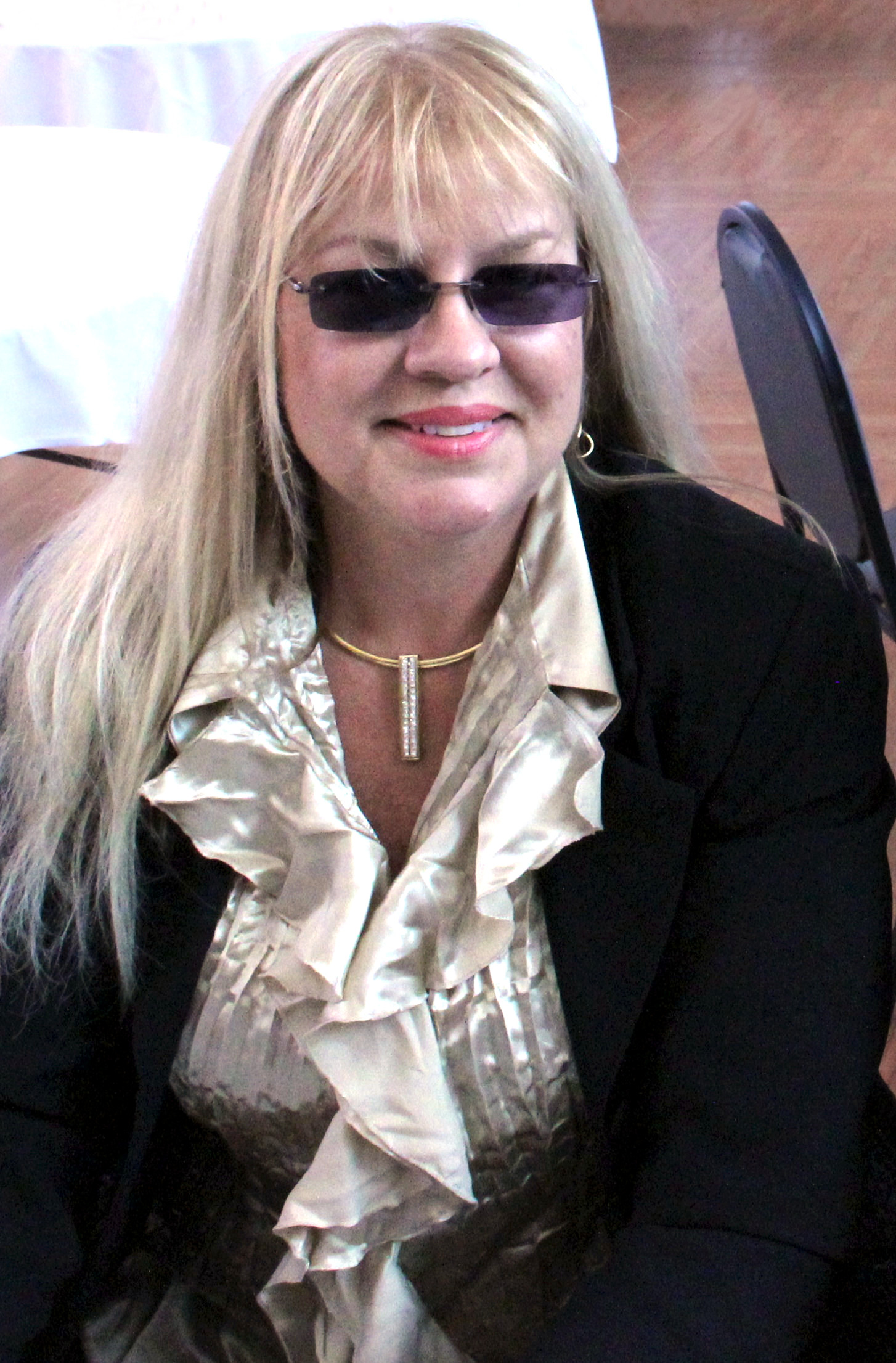
Wendi Richter

- Toni Adams (1964–2010), wrestling manager and valet
- Stone Cold Steve Austin (born 1964), WWE wrestler and actor
- Texas Tank Bernard, wrestler
- Tully Blanchard (born 1954), NWA wrestler, original Four Horsemen member
- Celeste Bonin (born 1986), WWE wrestler known as Kaitlyn
- Mark Calaway (born 1965), WWE wrestler known as The Undertaker
- Dixie Carter (born 1964), President of TNA Wrestling
- Bobby Duncum Jr. (1965–2000), former WCW wrestler
- Dory Funk Sr. (1919–1973), wrestler, trainer, and promoter
- Dory Funk Jr. (born 1941), NWA wrestler and trainer
- Terry Funk (1944–2023) NWA and ECW champion, one of the first hardcore wrestlers
- Gorgeous George (George Wagner) (1915–1963), professional wrestler, grew up in Houston
- Nidia Guenard (born 1979), former WWE wrestler and 2001 WWE Tough Enough Co-winner
- Eddie Guerrero (1967–2005), WWE champion
- Chavo Guerrero Sr. (1949–2017), former NWA champion
- Chavo Guerrero Jr. (born 1970), WCW and WWE wrestler
- Vickie Guerrero (born 1968), WWE personality
- Stan Hansen (born 1949), AJPW wrestler
- Mark Henry (born 1971), WWE wrestler
- Shawn Hernandez (born 1973), TNA wrestler
- Lance Hoyt (born 1977), TNA wrestler
- Booker Huffman (born 1965), WCW and WWE wrestler known as Booker T
- Lash Huffman (born 1958), WCW wrestler
- John Layfield (born 1966), former WWE champion JBL/Bradshaw
- Tamyra Mensah-Stock (born 1992), women's freestyle wrestler; World champion, Olympic gold medalist at 2020 Olympics
- Shawn Michaels (born 1965), former WWE wrestler and champion
- Jacqueline Moore (born 1964), former WWE women's champion
- Blackjack Mulligan (1942–2016), former NWA wrestler
- Dick Murdoch (1946–1996), former NWA wrestler
- Bruce Prichard (born 1963), Brother Love in the WWE
- Tom Prichard (born 1959), WWE wrestler
- Scott Putski (born 1966), former WCW and WWE wrestler
- Dustin Rhodes (born 1969), WWE wrestler Goldust
- Dusty Rhodes (1945–2015), WWE wrestler
- Wendi Richter (born 1961), WWE wrestler
- Jake "The Snake" Roberts (born 1955), former WWE wrestler
- Tito Santana (born 1953), former WWE wrestler
- Jesse Sorensen (born 1989), TNA wrestler
- Robert Swenson (1957–1997), former WCW wrestler and actor
- Von Erich Family, wrestling family which competed in various Texas and southern promotions
- Erik Watts (born 1967), former WCW wrestler
- Alicia Webb (born 1979), former WWE star Ryan Shamrock
- Barry Windham (born 1960), former NWA and WCW wrestler
- Kendall Windham (born 1967), former NWA and WCW wrestler

=== Soccer ===
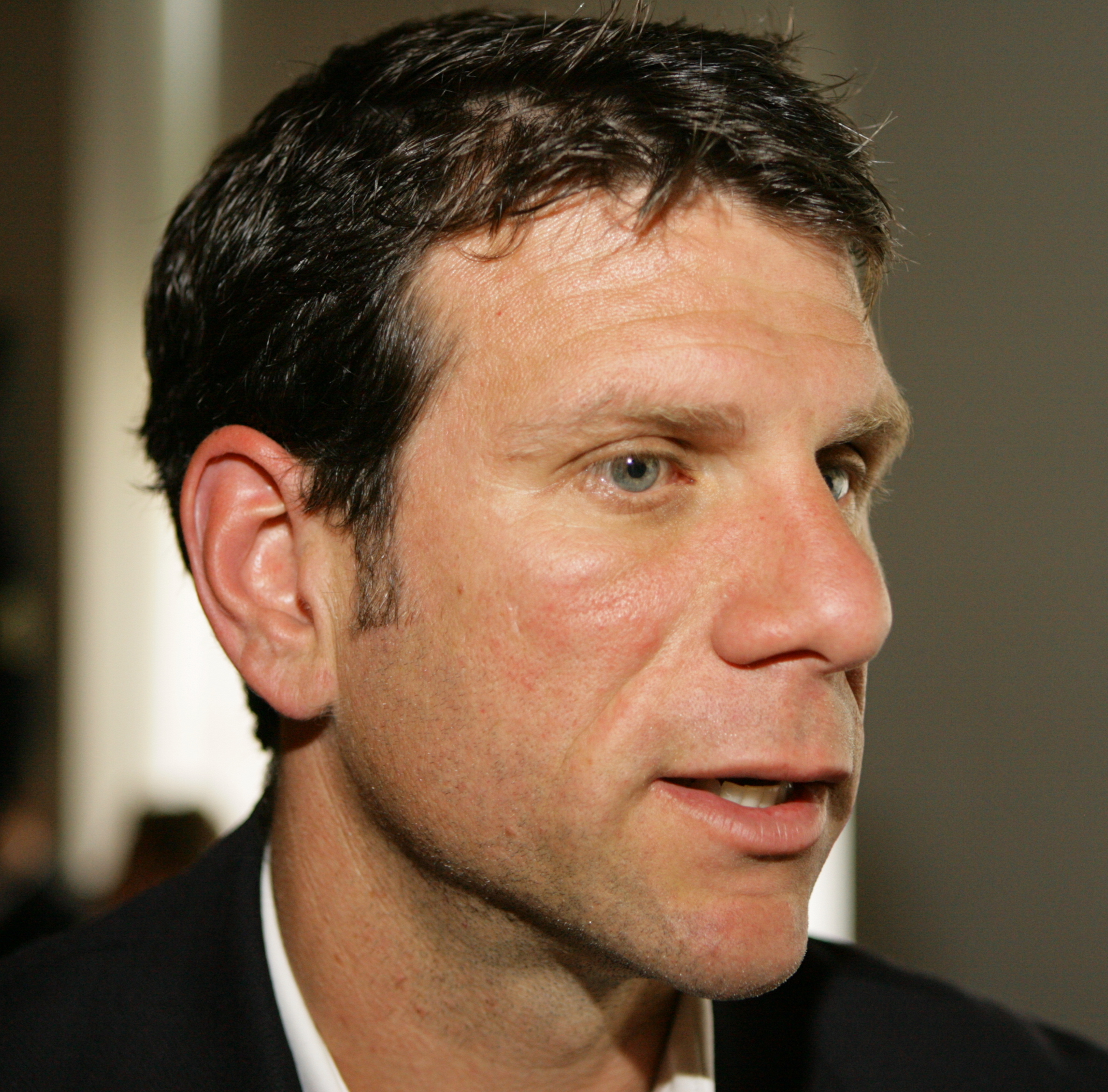
Jeff Agoos

- Jeff Agoos (born 1968), Swiss-born American soccer defender, Hall of Fame
- Neil Cohen (born 1955), soccer player
- Clint Dempsey (born 1983), soccer player, plays for Fulham FC and United States Men's National Soccer Team
- Nick Garcia (born 1979), soccer player
- Omar Gonzalez (born 1988), soccer player
- Weston McKennie (born 1998), soccer player, plays for Juventus and United States Men's National Soccer Team
- Hassan Nazari (born 1956), soccer player, coach, youth club founder
- Lee Nguyen (born 1986), soccer player
- Bárbara Olivieri (born 2002), soccer player, plays for Houston Dash and Venezuela women's national football team

=== Swimming ===
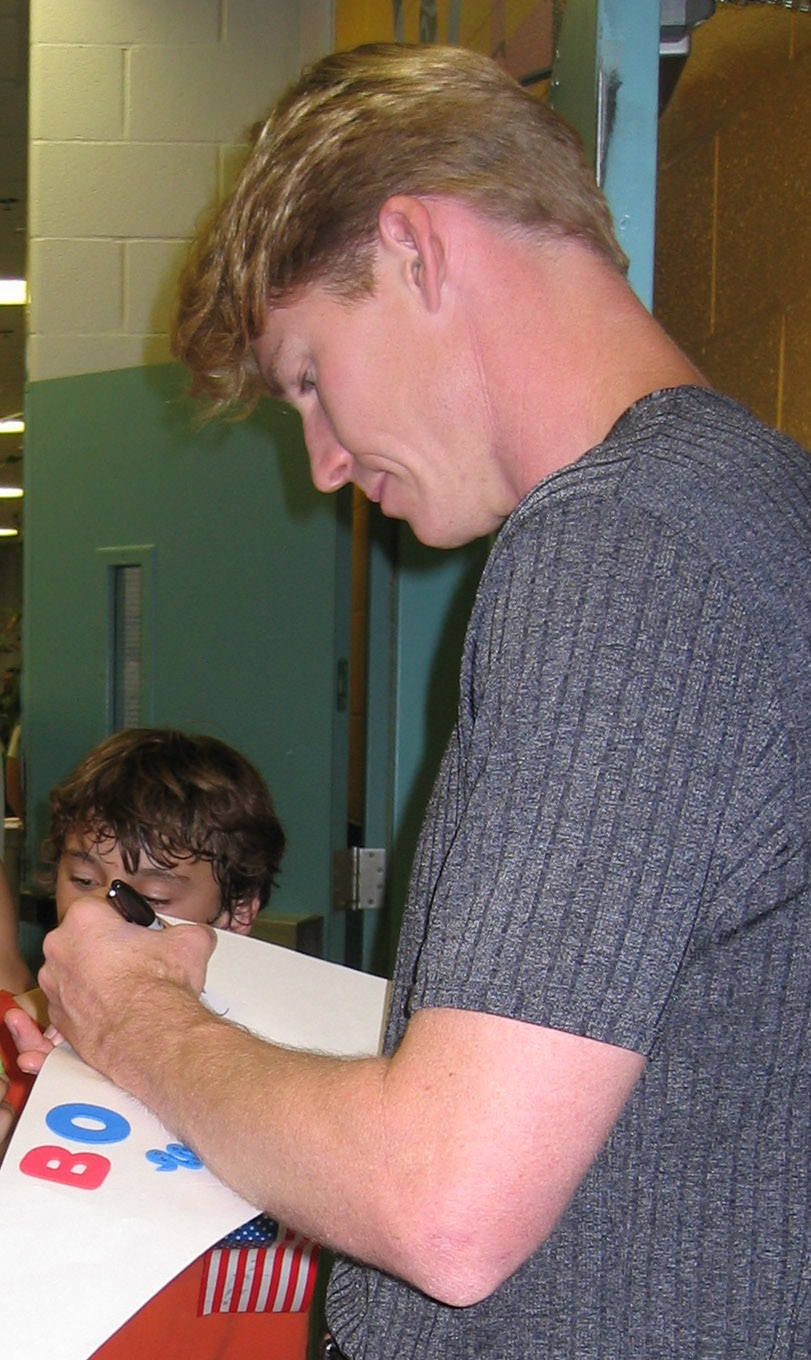
Josh Davis

- Cammile Adams (born 1991), Olympic swimmer
- Shaine Casas (born 1999), competitive swimmer
- Madisyn Cox (born 1995), competitive swimmer
- Carli Cronk (born 2006), deaf swimmer
- Josh Davis (born 1972), Olympic gold and silver medalist in freestyle swimming
- Jimmy Feigen (born 1989), Olympic swimmer and gold medalist
- Natalie Hinds (born 1993), Olympic swimmer
- Micah Lawrence (born 1990), Olympic swimmer
- Celina Lemmen (born 1985), Olympic swimmer
- Simone Manuel (born 1996), Olympic swimmer and gold medalist
- Katie Meili (born 1991), Olympic swimmer and bronze medalist
- Dana Vollmer (born 1987), swimmer, gold medalist at 2004 Olympics

=== Tennis ===
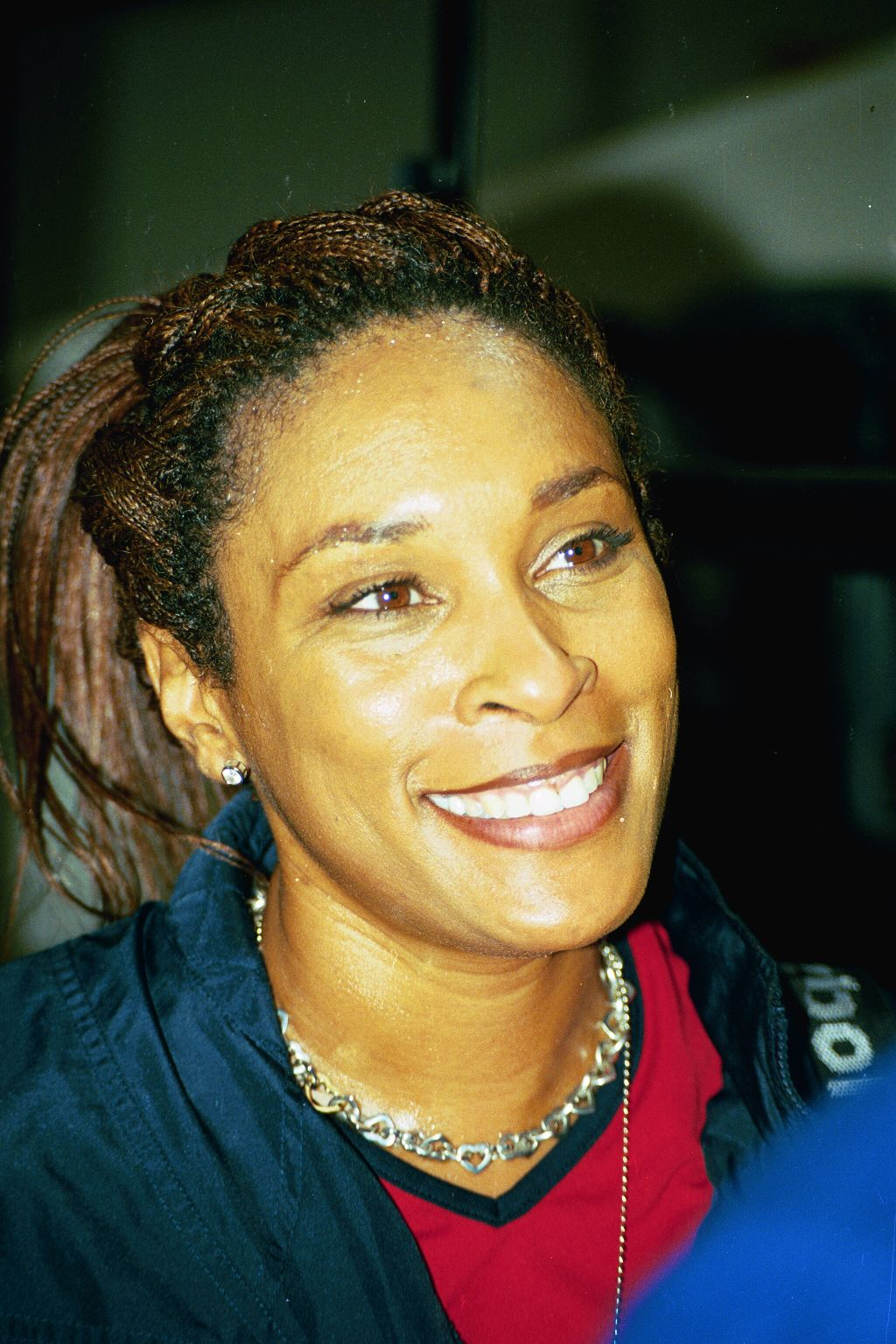
Zina Garrison

- Fiona Crawley (born 2002), tennis player
- Zina Garrison (born 1963), tennis player
- Liv Hovde (born 2005), tennis player, won Wimbledon girls' singles title
- Karl Kamrath (1911–1988), tennis player, architect
- Cliff Richey (born 1946), tennis player, achieved world number-six ranking
- Nancy Richey (born 1942), tennis player, won six major championships in singles and doubles, achieved world number-two ranking
- Michael Russell (born 1978), tennis player
- Dick Savitt (1927–2023), tennis player ranked number two in the world
- Bill Scanlon (1956–2021), tennis player
- Anne Smith (born 1959), tennis player, ten major championships in doubles, ranked world number one in doubles

=== Track and field ===
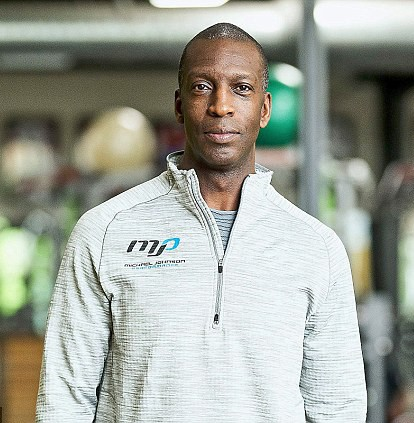
Michael Johnson

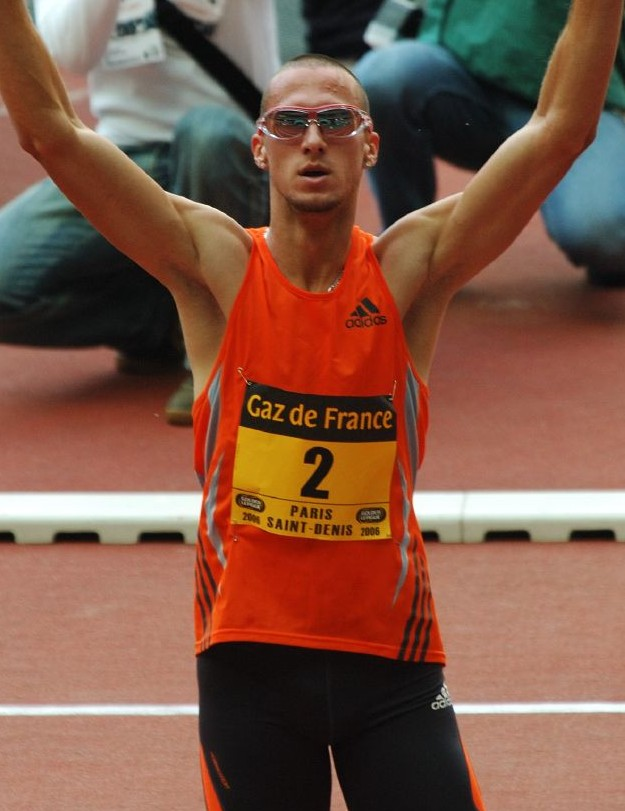
Jeremy Wariner

- Brigetta Barrett (born 1990), high jumper
- Matthew S. Brown (born 1976), track and field champion at 2007 Parapan American Games in Rio de Janeiro
- Cameron Burrell (1994–2021), sprinter
- Dave Clark (1936–2018), Olympic pole vaulter
- Melissa Gonzalez (born 1994), hurdler
- Carlette Guidry-White (born 1968), sprinter
- Leonard Hilton (1947–2000), distance runner
- Ariana Ince (born 1989), javelin thrower
- Kortnei Johnson (born 1997), sprinter
- Michael Johnson (born 1967), sprinter, Olympic gold medalist, world record holder
- Maggie Malone (born 1993), javelin thrower
- Bobby Morrow (1935–2020), Olympic-champion sprinter
- Sha'Carri Richardson (born 2000), sprinter
- Louise Ritter (born 1958), Olympic gold medalist in high jump
- Raevyn Rogers (born 1996), middle-distance runner, Olympic medalist
- Tom Tellez (born 1933), collegiate track and field coach
- Jeremy Wariner (born 1984), track & field Olympic gold medalist
- Mal Whitfield (1924–2015), Olympic gold medalist in the 800-meter run
- Darold Williamson (born 1983), Olympic gold medalist in track & field
- Babe Didrikson Zaharias (1914–1956), track & field gold medalist 1932 Olympics, golfer in World Golf Hall of Fame

=== Mind sports ===
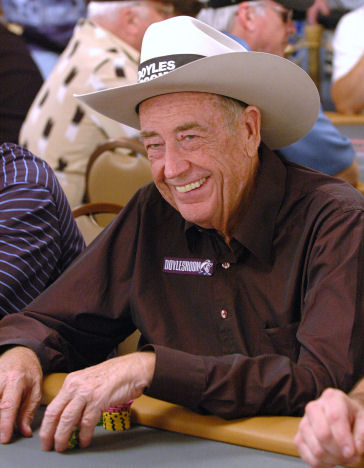
Doyle Brunson

- Amarillo Slim (Thomas Preston Jr.) (1928–2012), poker champion
- Doyle Brunson (1933–2023), professional poker player
- Johnny Chan (born 1957), professional poker player
- Bobby Goldman (1938–1999), bridge player
- Bob Hamman (born 1938), bridge player
- James Jacoby (1933–1991), bridge player
- Oswald Jacoby (1902–1984), bridge player
- Ruifeng Li (born 2001), chess grandmaster
- Johnny Moss (1907–1995), professional poker player
- Robert Salaburu (born 1985), poker player
- Akash Vukoti (born 2009), qualified six times for the Scripps National Spelling Bee
- David Williams (born 1980), poker player
- Trey Wright (born 1974), U.S. national Scrabble champion, classical concert pianist

=== Other ===
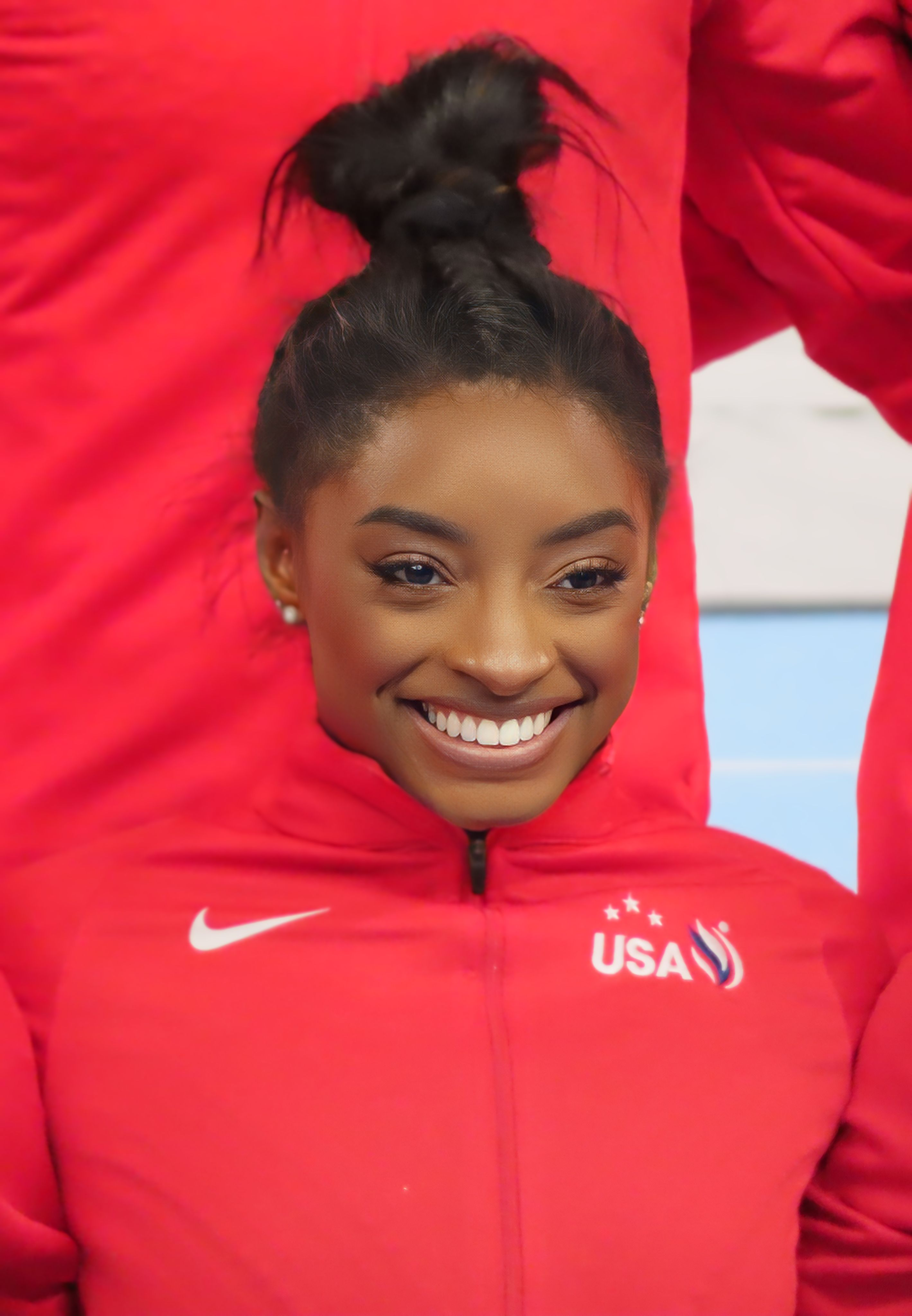
Simone Biles

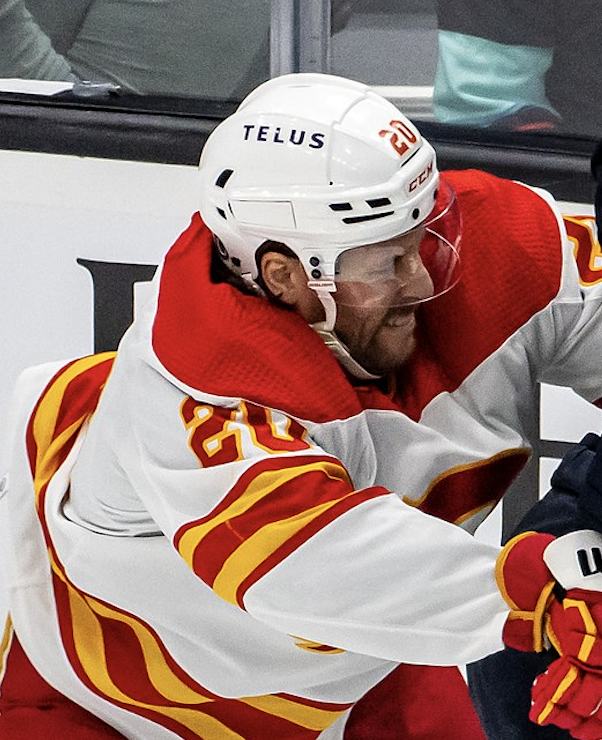
Blake Coleman

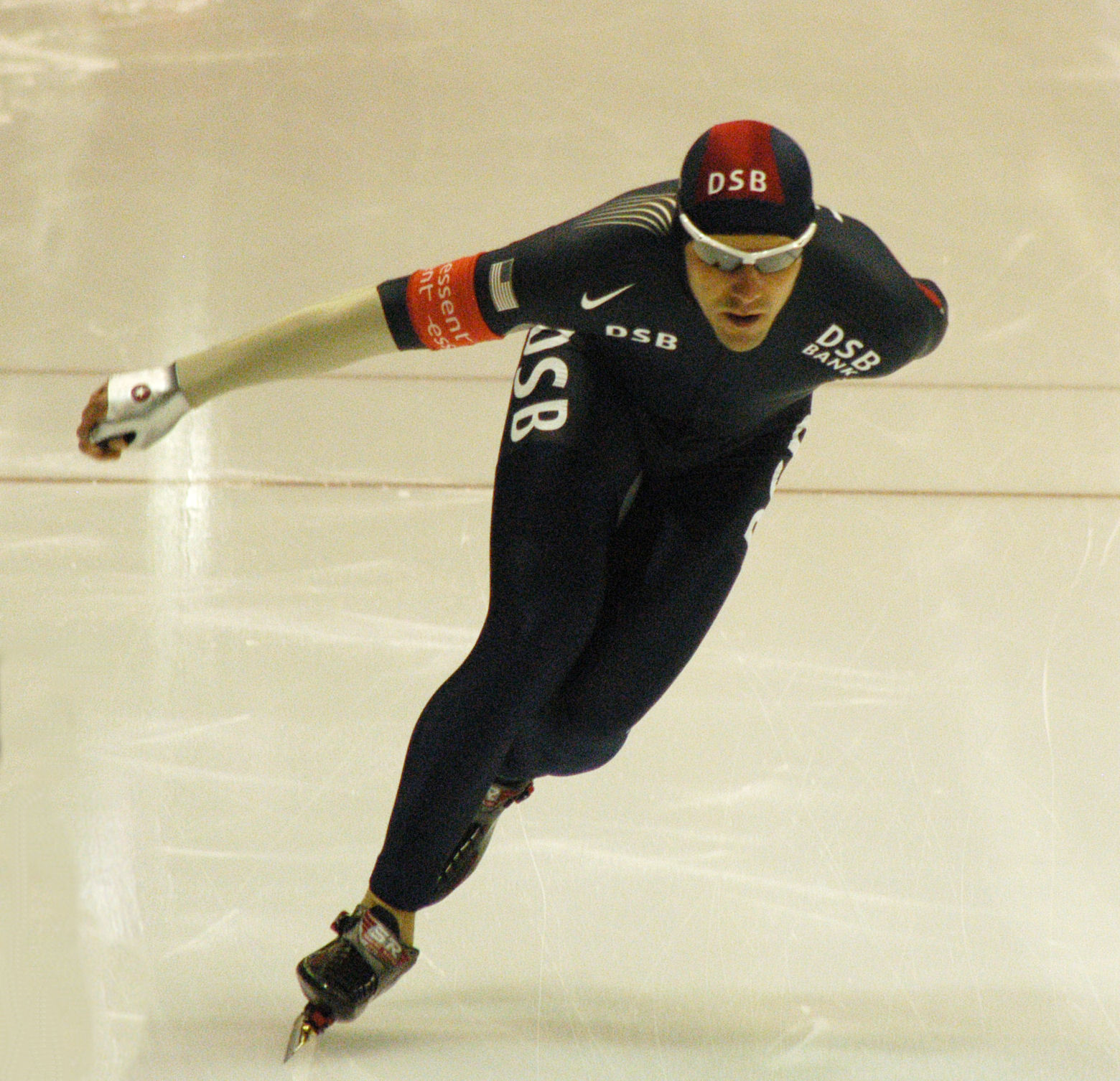
Chad Hedrick

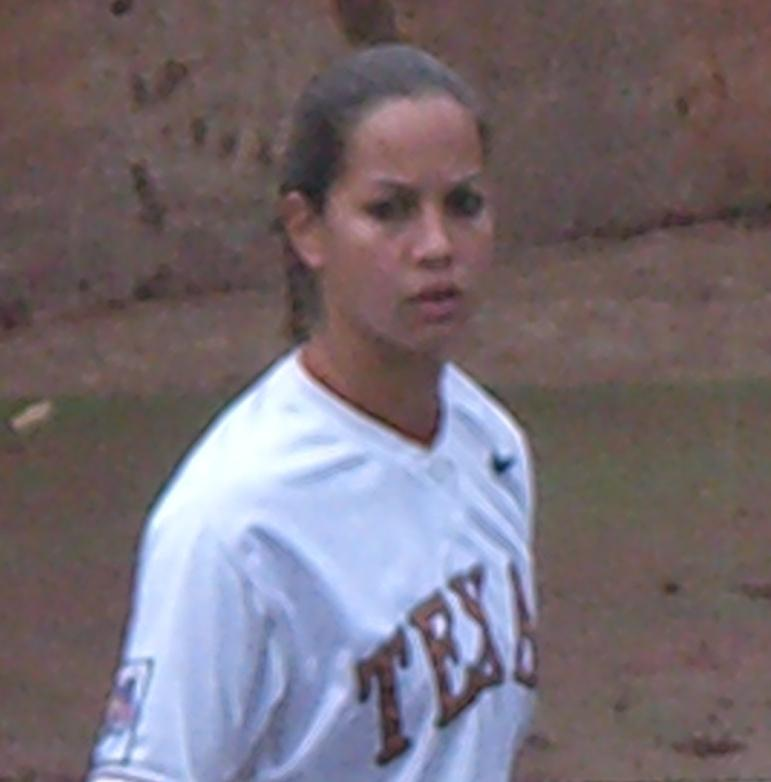
Cat Osterman

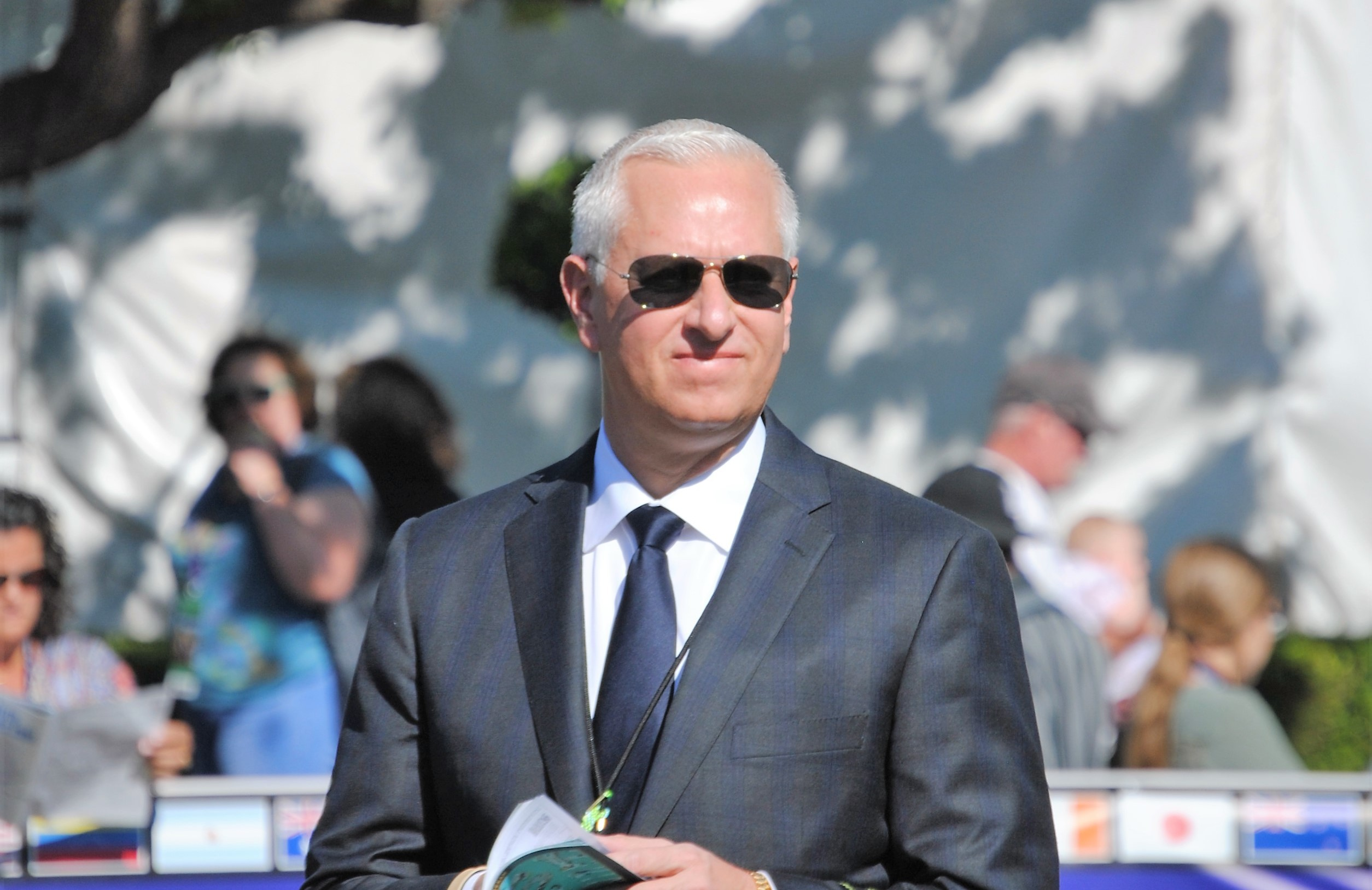
Todd Pletcher

- Terence Anderson (born c. 1946), sport shooter
- Lance Armstrong (born 1971), cyclist, disqualified champion of Tour de France
- Del Ballard Jr. (born 1963), professional bowler
- Richard Bass (1929–2015), mountaineer, first person to climb the "Seven Summits"; business owner
- Kyle Bennett (1979–2012), bicycle motocross racer
- Evan Bernstein (born 1960), Israeli Olympic wrestler
- Simone Biles (born 1997), world- and Olympic-champion gymnast
- Aimee Boorman (born 1973), gymnastics coach
- Aimee Buchanan (born 1993), American-born Olympic figure skater for Israel
- Jared Cannonier (born 1984), mixed martial artist
- Blake Coleman (born 1991), professional ice hockey forward
- Roy Cooper (1955–2025), rodeo cowboy
- Tervel Dlagnev (born 1985), Olympic Greco-Roman wrestler, bronze medalist at 2012 Summer Olympics
- Arlo Eisenberg (born 1973), aggressive inline skater
- Cowboy Morgan Evans (1903–1969), rodeo, steer wrestling champion 1928
- Jennifer Gutierrez (born 1967), triathlete
- Mauro Hamza (born 1965 or 1966), banned Egyptian fencing coach
- Chad Hedrick (born 1977), inline speed skater and ice speed skater
- Heath Herring (born 1978), mixed martial artist
- Seth Jones (born 1994), ice hockey player for the Columbus Blue Jackets
- Baylee Klingler (born 1999), softball player
- Madison Kocian (born 1997), world- and Olympic-champion gymnast
- Courtney Kupets (born 1986), world and U.S. champion gymnast, silver medalist in 2004 Summer Olympics
- Brian Leetch (born 1968), Hall of Fame hockey defenseman, primarily with the New York Rangers
- Tara Lipinski (born 1982), figure skater, Olympic gold medalist
- Nastia Liukin (born 1989), 2008 Olympic gymnastics all-around gold medalist
- Jeffrey Louis, aka B-Boy Jeffro (born 1994), Olympic breakdancer
- Patricia McCormick (1929–2013), bullfighter
- Bubba McDaniel (born 1983), mixed martial artist
- Delaney Miller (born 1995), rock climber
- Robert Mosbacher (1927–2010), yacht racer, businessman, politician
- Bo Nickal (born 1996), mixed martial artist, former freestyle and folkstyle wrestler
- Cat Osterman (born 1983), softball pitcher
- Carly Patterson (born 1988), 2004 Olympic gymnastics all-around gold medalist
- Jeff Phillips (1963–1993), skateboarder
- Bill Pickett (1870–1932), cowboy and rodeo performer
- Todd Pletcher (born 1967), horse trainer
- Alex Puccio (born 1989), climber
- Tex Rickard (1870–1929), sports promoter
- Ruth Roach (1896–1986), rodeo rider
- Joscelyn Roberson (born 2006), gymnast
- Keith Sanderson (born 1975), sport shooter
- Ruth Taubert Seeger (1924–2014), athlete and coach, competed in 1957 Summer Deaflympics, member of Texas Women's Hall of Fame
- Willie Shoemaker (1931–2003), jockey
- Brandon Slay (born 1975), Olympic freestyle wrestler, gold medalist at 2000 Olympics
- Kamaru Usman (born 1987), mixed martial artist, former UFC Welterweight Champion
- Hollie Vise (born 1987), world-champion gymnast
- Walel Watson (born 1984), mixed martial artist
- Beck Weathers (born 1946), mountain climber, survived the 1996 Mount Everest disaster; pathologist
- Kaitlyn Weaver (born 1989), ice dancer, competes for Canada
- Chip Woolley (born 1963), racehorse trainer
- Kim Zmeskal (born 1976), 1992 world-champion/Olympic gymnast

== Business ==
A–E

- Red Adair (1915–2004), offshore oil field firefighter
- Joe Allbritton (1924–2012), banker, publisher, philanthropist
- Monroe Dunaway Anderson (1873–1939), banker, cotton trader, business executive, philanthropist
- John S. Armstrong (1850–1908), Dallas-area real estate developer, founded Oak Cliff, Highland Park, the State Fair of Texas
- Mary Kay Ash (1918–2001), businesswoman and founder of Mary Kay Cosmetics
- George Ballas (1925–2011), entrepreneur, invented Weed Eater
- Ed Bass (born 1945), businessman, financier, philanthropist, environmentalist
- Harry W. Bass Jr. (1927–1998), oil business, philanthropist
- Harry W. Bass Sr. (1895–1970), oil business
- Richard Bass (1929–2015), owner of the Snowbird Ski Resort; pioneering mountaineer
- Robert Bass (born 1948), billionaire philanthropist, chairman of Oak Hill Capital, conservationist
- Sid Bass (born 1942), billionaire investor and oil magnate from Fort Worth
- Andrew Beal (born 1952), banker, businessman, investor, poker player, mathematician and billionaire
- Monty Bennett (born c. 1964), businessman, newspaper publisher
- Benny Binion (1904–1989), Las Vegas casino owner; previously an organized-crime boss
- Jack Binion (born 1937), businessman
- Jack S. Blanton (1927–2013), oil industry executive, civic leader, philanthropist
- Ghulam Bombaywala (born 1973), restaurateur
- David Bonderman (1942–2024), businessman, billionaire
- Kimberly S. Bowers (born 1965), business executive
- George Washington Brackenridge (1832–1920), banker, business executive, philanthropist, social activist, university regent
- Nancy Brinker (born 1946), business executive, ambassador
- Norman Brinker (1931–2009), restaurateur
- George R. Brown (1898–1983), construction company founder, entrepreneur, philanthropist
- Samuel Burk Burnett (1849–1922), cattleman, rancher
- Charles Butt (born 1938), CEO of H-E-B supermarket chain, billionaire
- Howard Edward Butt Sr. (1895–1991), businessman, philanthropist; founded H-E-B grocery store chain
- David Harold Byrd (1900–1986), oilman, founder of Civil Air Patrol
- Frank Kell Cahoon (1934–2013), oilman, natural gas entrepreneur, state representative
- Joseph Campisi (1918–1990), restaurateur
- Don Carter (1933–2018), investor, businessman; owned professional sports teams
- Rex Cauble (1913–2003), oilman, rancher, western-wear merchant, millionaire
- Josef Centeno, chef, restaurateur
- Eddie Chiles (1910–1993), oil business founder and executive; major-league baseball team owner
- George W. Church Sr. (1887–1956), founder of Church's Chicken
- Sarah Horton Cockrell (1819–1892), businesswoman, millionaire
- Carr Collins Sr. (1892–1980), insurance magnate, philanthropist
- Brad Corbett (1937–2012), oil business, owned the Texas Rangers baseball team
- Helen Corbitt (1906–1978), chef, cookbook author
- George Coulam (c. 1938 – 2025), businessman, founded Texas Renaissance Festival
- Harlan Crow (born 1949), real estate developer
- Trammell Crow (1914–2009), commercial real estate developer
- Mary C. Crowley (1915–1986), business executive
- Sherwood Cryer (1927–2009), entrepreneur, co-owned and operated Gilley's honky-tonk nightclub
- Mark Cuban (born 1958), billionaire entrepreneur, minority owner of Dallas Mavericks basketball team
- Joseph S. Cullinan (1860–1937), oil industrialist, founder of Texaco
- Robert B. Cullum (1912–1981), founder of Tom Thumb supermarket chain
- Ray Davis (born 1941), business executive, baseball team owner
- Robert Decherd (born 1951), businessman; chairman, president, and CEO of A. H. Belo
- Adam Dell (born 1970), venture capitalist
- Michael Dell (born 1965), founder of Dell Inc.
- Tiffany Derry (born 1982), chef, restaurateur
- Clara Driscoll (1881–1945), businesswoman, philanthropist, historic preservationist
- Angelo Drossos (1928–1997), stockbroker, owner of San Antonio Spurs
- Charles Duncan Jr. (1926–2022), president of The Coca-Cola Company
- Dan Duncan (1933–2010), business executive, entrepreneur
- Thomas Dundon (born 1972), financial businessman and owner of the Carolina Hurricanes hockey team and Portland Trail Blazers basketball team

F–J

- William Stamps Farish II (1881–1942), president of Standard Oil, founder and president of American Petroleum Institute
- Dean Fearing (born 1955), chef, restaurateur
- Tilman J. Fertitta (born 1957), CEO of Landry's Restaurants, billionaire, owner of the Houston Rockets basketball team
- Carly Fiorina (born 1954), CEO of Hewlett-Packard, senior vice president at AT&T, and Ted Cruz's running mate in the 2016 election
- Don Flynn (1934–2010), oil and gas industry executive, professional football player
- Buddy Fogelson (1900–1987), oilman, lawyer, horse breeder, philanthropist; husband of Greer Garson
- Robert Folsom (1927–2017), real estate investor and developer; mayor of Dallas
- Walter Fondren Sr. (1877–1939), oilman, co-founder of Humble Oil (which would become ExxonMobil), philanthropist
- Gerald J. Ford (born 1944), business executive, banker, billionaire, philanthropist
- Joe B. Foster (1934–2020), oil business, philanthropist
- Paul L. Foster (born 1957), business executive, philanthropist
- Milane Frantz (born 1970), investor, billionaire
- Andrew Friedman (born 1976), banker, Major League Baseball executive
- William Delbert Gann (1878–1955), finance trader, analyst
- William H. Gaston (1840–1927), co-founder, with Aaron C. Camp, of the first banking house in Dallas
- Scott Ginsburg (1952–2024), business executive, philanthropist
- Jim Goode (1944–2016), restaurateur
- Charles Goodnight (1836–1929), legendary Texas cattleman
- Bette Nesmith Graham (1924–1980), inventor, founder of Liquid Paper Corporation, mother of The Monkees' Mike Nesmith
- Eunice Gray (1880–1962), hotel and brothel owner
- Bennett Greenspan (born 1952), entrepreneur, founder of Family Tree DNA
- Carl Hilmar Guenther (1826–1902), miller
- Patrick E. Haggerty (1914–1980), co-founder, president, and chairman of Texas Instruments
- Najeeb Halaby (1915–2003), FAA administrator, chairman and CEO of Pan Am, father of Queen Noor of Jordan
- Henry Mayer Halff (1874–1934), rancher, horse breeder
- Mayer Halff (1836–1905), pioneering cattle rancher
- Ebby Halliday (1911–2015), realtor, entrepreneur
- Jake L. Hamon Jr. (1902–1985), oilman, philanthropist
- Jerome K. Harris Jr. (1931–2013), businessman, helped to promote HemisFair '68
- Jerome K. Harris Sr. (1899–1984), businessman, originated idea for and named HemisFair '68
- Thomas Britton Harris IV (born 1958), investment officer
- Jim Hasslocher (1922–2015), restaurateur
- William R. Hawn (1910–1995), businessman, philanthropist, racehorse breeder
- Tom Hicks (1946–2025), private equity investor, sports team owner
- Pattillo Higgins (1863–1955), oil pioneer and businessman, known as the "prophet of Spindletop"
- Barron Hilton (1927–2019), billionaire socialite, businessman, heir to Hilton Hotels fortune and former owner of San Diego Chargers football team
- Conrad Hilton (1887–1979), hotel-chain founder
- Conrad Hilton Jr. (1926–1969), socialite, businessman, heir to Hilton Hotels fortune
- Eric Hilton (1933–2016), hotelier, philanthropist
- Gerald D. Hines (1925–2020), real-estate developer
- Timothy Dwight Hobart (1855–1935), landowner, surveyor, rancher, mayor of Pampa
- Peter Holt (born 1948), businessman, headed group that owns San Antonio sports teams and former owner of the San Antonio Spurs basketball team
- Roger Horchow (1928–2020), catalog entrepreneur, Broadway producer
- Thomas William House Sr. (1814–1880), early Houston cotton shipper, founder of Houston's first private bank and first public utility
- Howard Hughes (1905–1976), aviator, filmmaker, eccentric billionaire
- Howard R. Hughes Sr. (1869–1924), entrepreneur, oilman; father of Howard Hughes
- Earl H. Hulsey (1880–1961), businessman, movie-theatre operator
- Caroline Rose Hunt (1923–2018), hotelier, author, philanthropist, heiress
- Clark Hunt (born 1965), chairman and CEO of the Kansas City Chiefs
- H. L. Hunt (1889–1974), oil tycoon, patriarch of Dallas family of legendary wealth and power
- Lamar Hunt (1932–2006), founder of American Football League, Major League Soccer, North American Soccer League
- Nelson Bunker Hunt (1926–2014), oilman, investor, horse breeder
- Ray Lee Hunt (born 1943), oilman
- William Herbert Hunt (1929–2024), oilman
- Columbus Marion "Dad" Joiner (1860–1947), oilman
- Jerry Jones (born 1942), billionaire entrepreneur, oilman, owner of Dallas Cowboys football team
- Jerry Jones Jr. (born 1969), Dallas Cowboys executive
- Stephen Jones (born 1964), Dallas Cowboys executive
- J. Erik Jonsson (1901–1995), co-founder and president of Texas Instruments, mayor of Dallas

K–M

- Herb Kelleher (1931–2019), founder and CEO of Southwest Airlines
- Gary C. Kelly (born 1955), CEO, Southwest Airlines
- Isaac Herbert Kempner (1873–1967), founder of Imperial Sugar, mayor of Galveston
- Kay Kimbell (1886–1964), entrepreneur, philanthropist; endowed Kimbell Art Museum
- Henrietta King (1832–1925), rancher (King Ranch), philanthropist
- Richard King (1824–1885), entrepreneur, founder of the legendary King Ranch
- Rollin King (1931–2014), businessman, investment consultant, co-founder of Southwest Airlines
- John Henry Kirby (1860–1940), businessman, founder of the Kirby Petroleum Company
- Robert J. Kleberg Jr. (1853–1932), managed the King Ranch
- Fred C. Koch (1900–1967), chemical engineer and entrepreneur who founded the oil refinery firm that later became Koch Industries
- Harry Koch (1867–1942), railroad founder, newspaper founder
- Tracy Krohn (born 1954), entrepreneur, auto racing enthusiast
- Eugene Lacritz (1929–2012), retail executive, classical musician
- Tony Lama (1887–1974), bootmaker
- Ninfa Laurenzo (1924–2001), restaurateur
- Rodney Lewis (born 1954), oil and natural gas industrialist and rancher; second wealthiest individual in San Antonio
- John Lilly (born 1971), venture capitalist
- James Ling (1922–2004), founder of business conglomerate Ling-Temco-Vought
- David Litman (born 1957), founder of hotels.com and getaroom.com
- Tim Love (born 1971), chef, restaurateur
- Sam Lucchese (1868–1929), businessman, bootmaker, theater impresario
- Gerald Lyda (1923–2005), construction CEO, owner of La Escalera Ranch in Sierra County, New Mexico
- James E. Lyon (1927–1993), real estate developer, banker, and Republican politician in Houston
- John Mackey (born 1953), CEO, Whole Foods Market
- Herbert Marcus (1878–1950), co-founder and CEO of Neiman Marcus
- Minnie Lichtenstein Marcus (1882–1979), vice president of Neiman Marcus, horticulturist
- Stanley Marcus (1905–2002), president and CEO of Neiman Marcus
- Thomas Marsalis (1852–1919), Dallas-area developer
- Mariano Martinez (born 1944), inventor, entrepreneur, restaurateur, invented frozen margarita machine
- Irving Allen Mathews (1917–1994), retail executive, Federal Reserve Bank board chairman
- Lowry Mays (1935–2022), businessman, co-founded Clear Channel Communications
- Glenn McCarthy (1907–1988), oil tycoon, entrepreneur; inspired the character Jett Rink in Giant
- Red McCombs (1927–2023), businessman, owned several professional sports franchises
- Eugene McDermott (1899–1973), founder of Texas Instruments, geophysicist, philanthropist
- William Johnson McDonald (1844–1926), banker, philanthropist
- Jim McIngvale (born 1951), businessman, owns furniture-store chain
- Algur H. Meadows (1899–1978), oilman, philanthropist
- John W. Mecom Sr. (1911–1981), oilman
- Morton Meyerson (1938–2025), computer industry executive
- George P. Mitchell (1919–2013), billionaire oilman, real estate developer, philanthropist
- Suzanne Mitchell (1943–2016), director of Dallas Cowboys Cheerleaders
- Mohamed Elhassan Mohamed (born 1961), entrepreneur; political, religious, cultural activist; father of Ahmed Mohamed
- William Moncrief (1920–2021), oilman, billionaire
- John T. Montford (born 1943), businessman in San Antonio, former chancellor of the Texas Tech University System, former state senator and district attorney from Lubbock
- Shearn Moody Jr. (1933–1996), financier, entrepreneur, philanthropist
- William Lewis Moody Jr. (1865–1954), financier, entrepreneur
- John Moores (born 1944), entrepreneur, philanthropist; owner of professional sports teams
- Shea Morenz (born 1974), business executive, former athlete
- Robert Mosbacher (1927–2010), businessman, yacht racer, politician
- Barry Munitz (born 1941), corporation and foundation executive, university administrator
- Clint Murchison Jr. (1923–1987), oil businessman; founder/owner of Dallas Cowboys football team
- Clint Murchison Sr. (1895–1969), oil magnate

N–R

- Raymond Nasher (1921–2007), real estate developer (NorthPark Center), art collector
- Abraham Lincoln Neiman (1875–1970), co-founder of Neiman Marcus
- Carrie Marcus Neiman (1883–1953), co-founder and CEO of Neiman Marcus
- Bill Noël (1914–1987), oil industrialist and philanthropist from Odessa
- J. Frank Norfleet (1865–1967), rancher, manhunter
- Mary Moody Northen (1892–1986), financier, philanthropist
- Jim Novy (1896–1971), businessman, entrepreneur, philanthropist, supported career of Lyndon B. Johnson; nicknamed "First Jew of Texas"
- Peter O'Donnell (1924–2021), investor, philanthropist, Republican state party chairman, 1962–1969; leader of the Draft Goldwater Committee in 1963–1964
- R.J. O'Donnell (1891–1959), businessman, theatre-chain manager, philanthropist
- William O'Neil (1933–2023), entrepreneur, stockbroker, writer, founded Investor's Business Daily
- Marc Ostrofsky (born 1961), venture capitalist, entrepreneur, investor, author
- Linda Pace (1945–2007), food magnate, artist, civic leader and philanthropist
- Ross Perot (1930–2019), entrepreneur; founder of EDS and Perot Systems; 1992 U.S. presidential candidate
- Bob J. Perry (1932–2013), homebuilder, political supporter
- Stephen Samuel Perry (1825–1874), manager of Peach Point Plantation, preserved historical manuscripts
- T. Boone Pickens (1928–2019), energy entrepreneur, philanthropist
- Lonnie "Bo" Pilgrim (1928–2017), founder, chairman, and principal owner of Pilgrim's Pride
- Bernard Rapoport (1917–2012), entrepreneur, philanthropist, author, business executive
- Kent Rathbun (born 1961), chef, restaurateur
- Lawrence G. Rawl (1928–2005), chairman and CEO of ExxonMobil
- Lee Raymond (1938–2026), chairman and CEO of ExxonMobil
- William Marsh Rice (1816–1900), merchant, investor, multimillionaire, philanthropist; namesake of Rice University
- Sid W. Richardson (1891–1959), oilman, cattleman, philanthropist
- Rich Riley (born 1973), Senior Vice President and managing director of Yahoo! EMEA
- Corbin Robertson (born 1947), business executive
- Phil Romano (born 1939), restaurateur
- Willy O. Rossel (1921–2015), chef
- Marvin Travis Runyon (1924–2004), business executive, U.S. Postmaster General
- Reid Ryan (born 1971), Major League Baseball executive, former player

S–T

- Fayez Sarofim (1929–2022), stock-fund manager, part owner of Houston Texans, philanthropist, billionaire
- Tom Scaperlanda (1895–1971), jeweler, circus historian and collector of circusana
- Julius Schepps (1895–1971), business owner, civic leader and philanthropist
- Arthur A. Seeligson Jr. (1920–2001), oilman, rancher, Thoroughbred racehorse owner/breeder
- Daniel R. Scoggin (born 1937), founder of TGI Friday's, Inc., restaurateur
- Frank Sharp (1906–1993), land developer
- Walter Benona Sharp (1870–1912), oilman, innovator, philanthropist
- Anna Shelton (1861–1939), real-estate developer, founder of women's clubs
- Ascher Silberstein (1852–1909), cattleman, banker, oilman, philanthropist
- Harold Simmons (1931–2013), billionaire businessman, banker, philanthropist; developed concept of leveraged buyout
- Bob R. Simpson (born 1948), business executive, baseball team owner
- Henry Singleton (1916–1999), electrical engineer, co-founder of Teledyne Technologies
- Bill Sinkin (1913–2014), banker, community activist
- Christopher Columbus Slaughter (1837–1919), rancher, cattle drover and breeder, banker, philanthropist
- Tom Slick (1916–1962), inventor, businessman, adventurer, entrepreneur, philanthropist
- Merrie Spaeth (born 1948), business public relations consultant, political consultant, educator, former actress
- John Sparks (1843–1908), cattle rancher, Texas Ranger, became governor of Nevada
- A. Latham Staples (born 1977), CEO of EXUSMED, Inc., civil rights activist, and founder/Chairman of Empowering Spirits Foundation
- Felix Stehling (1927–2012), businessman, restaurateur, founded Taco Cabana
- John M. Stemmons (1909–2001), real estate developer, civic leader
- Leslie Stemmons (1876–1939), businessman
- Frank Sterling (1869–1938), oil business
- Ross S. Sterling (1875–1949), founder of Humble Oil (which would become ExxonMobil), governor of Texas
- James Stillman (1850–1918), banker, investor, corporate executive
- Averie Swanson, brewmaster
- David Tallichet (1922–2007), developed the theme restaurant concept
- Anne Valliant Burnett Tandy (1900–1980), rancher, horsebreeder, philanthropist, art collector
- Charles D. Tandy (1918–1978), chairman, president, and CEO of Tandy Corporation
- Ben Taub (1889–1982), businessman, philanthropist
- Rich Templeton (born 1958), president, chairman, and CEO of Texas Instruments
- John Philp Thompson Sr. (1925–2003), convenience-store business executive, philanthropist, civic leader
- Robert L. Thornton (1880–1964), founder and president of Mercantile Bank in Dallas, mayor and civic leader of Dallas
- Tex Thornton (1913–1981), founder of Litton Industries
- Felix Tijerina (1905–1965), restaurateur
- Rex Tillerson (born 1952), chairman, president and CEO of ExxonMobil
- Kenny Troutt (born 1948), telecommunications company founder, racehorse owner, billionaire

U–Z

- Daniel Waggoner (1828–1902), rancher, businessman, banker
- E. Paul Waggoner (1889–1967), rancher, horsebreeder
- Guy Waggoner (1883–1950), rancher, business executive
- William Thomas Waggoner (1852–1934), rancher, oilman, banker, horsebreeder, philanthropist
- Kelcy Warren (born 1955), chairman and CEO of Energy Transfer Partners
- Sherron Watkins (born 1959), vice president at the Enron Corporation, whistleblower who helped uncover the Enron scandal
- Jeff Webb (1950–2026), cheerleading business executive
- George Washington West (1851–1926), rancher
- James Marion West Jr. (1903–1957), oilman
- James Marion West Sr. (1871–1941), business tycoon
- Edward Whitacre Jr. (born 1941), chairman of the board and CEO of General Motors, chairman of the board and CEO of AT&T Inc.
- Clayton Wheat Williams Jr. (1931–2020), oilman; Republican gubernatorial nominee, 1990
- Gus Sessions Wortham (1891–1976), businessman, philanthropist
- Charles Wyly (1933–2011), entrepreneur, businessman, philanthropist, civic leader
- Sam Wyly (born 1934), entrepreneur, businessman, philanthropist
- Angus G. Wynne (1914–1979), founder of Six Flags Over Texas and subsequent corporate theme parks
- Shannon Wynne (born 1951), restaurateur
- Benjamin Franklin Yoakum (1859–1929), railroad executive
- H.B. Zachry (1901–1984), construction business executive
- Zig Ziglar (1926–2012), salesman, motivational speaker, author
- Andrew Jackson Zilker (1858–1934), businessman, civic leader, philanthropist in Austin

== Law and jurisprudence ==
- James A. Baker Jr. (1892–1973), attorney
- Captain James A. Baker (1857–1941), attorney for William Marsh Rice, banker
- Judge James A. Baker (1821–1897), jurist, politician
- Roy Bean (c. 1825–1903), justice of the peace, called himself "The Law West of the Pecos"
- Jean Hudson Boyd (born 1954), district court judge who sentenced Ethan Couch to probation based on "affluenza" defense
- John W. Brady (1869?–1943), lawyer
- Will P. Brady (1876–1943), district attorney
- Ruth Virginia Brazzil (1889–1976), lawyer
- Tony Buzbee (born 1968), trial lawyer
- Norma V. Cantu (born 1954), civil rights lawyer, educator
- Ronald H. Clark (born 1953), judge of the United States District Court for the Eastern District of Texas, based in Beaumont; former member of the Texas House of Representatives from Sherman
- Tom C. Clark (1899–1977), United States attorney general and Associate Justice of the Supreme Court of the United States
- Linda Coffee (born 1942), attorney for Norma McCorvey in Roe v. Wade
- Dick DeGuerin (born 1941), criminal defense attorney
- Elma Salinas Ender (born 1953), first Hispanic female to serve on a state district court in Texas; judge of the 341st Judicial District, based in Laredo, 1983–2012
- Percy Foreman (1902–1988), criminal defense attorney
- Hans Peter Mareus Neilsen Gammel (1854–1931), editor and publisher of The Laws of Texas 1822–1897
- Mike Godwin (born 1956), attorney, author
- Alberto Gonzales (born 1955), United States attorney general
- Richard "Racehorse" Haynes (1927–2017), defense attorney, author
- Randy Hendricks (born 1945), sports lawyer, author
- Hattie Leah Henenberg (1893–1974), lawyer
- Harry Hertzberg (1883–1940), attorney, Texas state senator, civic leader
- Barbara Hines, immigration rights attorney
- Joe Jamail (1925–2015), attorney, billionaire
- Leon Jaworski (1905–1982), attorney, was special prosecutor during the Watergate scandal hearings
- Jim Mattox (1943–2008), U.S. representative and attorney general of Texas
- Harry McPherson (1929–2012), special counsel to President Lyndon Johnson, lawyer, lobbyist
- Harriet Miers (born 1945), attorney, White House counsel, nominated for U.S. Supreme Court
- Sandra Day O'Connor (1930–2023), former associate justice of the United States Supreme Court; first woman on the high court
- John O'Quinn (1941–2009), attorney
- George Peddy (1892–1951), attorney, military officer, politician
- Jack Pope (1913–2017), chief justice of Texas Supreme Court
- Louise Raggio (1919–2011), attorney, first female prosecutor in Texas
- Nellie Gray Robertson (1894–1955), lawyer
- David McAdams Sibley (born 1948), attorney-lobbyist, former Texas state senator (1991–2002) and mayor of Waco (1987–1988)
- Al Staehely (born 1945), entertainment industry lawyer, rock singer-songwriter
- Ken Starr (1946–2022), attorney, federal judge, solicitor general, and independent counsel during the Clinton Administration
- Stephen Susman (1941–2020), plaintiffs attorney and a founding partner of Susman Godfrey
- Carol Vance (1933–2022), district attorney, head of Texas Board of Criminal Justice
- Dale Wainwright (born 1961), justice, Texas Supreme Court
- Hortense Sparks Ward (1872–1944), lawyer, women's rights activist
- Craig Watkins (1967–2023), first African-American district attorney in Texas, Dallas Morning News Texan of the Year 2008
- Robert McAlpin Williamson (1804? – 1859), Republic of Texas Supreme Court justice; Williamson County, Texas was named for him
- Edith Wilmans (1882–1966), lawyer, state legislator
- Will Wilson (1912–2005), attorney general of Texas, Texas Supreme Court justice
- Jared Woodfill (born 1968), attorney, political activist
- Mark Yudof (born 1944), law professor, university chancellor
- Kathleen Zellner (born 1949), attorney

== Law enforcement ==
- David Brown (born 1960), chief of Dallas Police Department
- Edna Reed Clayton DeWees (1921–2009), first woman elected sheriff in Texas
- J. W. Fritz (1896–1984), Dallas Police captain, investigated John F. Kennedy assassination
- Ruben Garcia Jr. (born 1951), former FBI Executive Assistant Director
- James B. Gillett (1856–1937), lawman, member of Texas Ranger Hall of Fame
- Manuel T. Gonzaullas (1891–1977), Texas Ranger captain
- T. J. Goree (1835–1905), superintendent of penitentiaries in Texas, namesake of the Goree Unit of the Texas Department of Criminal Justice; Confederate Army captain, attorney
- Frank Hamer (1884–1955), Texas Ranger, led raid in which Bonnie and Clyde were killed
- Roy Hazelwood (1938–2016), FBI profiler
- Ted Hinton (1904–1977), deputy sheriff involved in raid in which Bonnie and Clyde were killed
- Joaquin Jackson (1935–2016), Texas Ranger, author, actor
- John B. Jones (1834–1881), captain of Texas Rangers Frontier Battalion
- Jim Leavelle (1920–2019), Dallas Police detective who was escorting Lee Harvey Oswald when Oswald was shot
- Darrell Lunsford (1943–1991), murdered while arresting drug suspects
- Ramiro Martinez (born 1937), police officer involved in killing of sniper Charles Whitman
- Junius Peak (1845–1934), Texas Ranger
- David Atlee Phillips (1922–1988), officer for the CIA, recipient of the Career Intelligence Medal
- Phil Ryan (born 1945), Texas Ranger who arrested serial killer Henry Lee Lucas
- Charlie Siringo (1855–1928), Wild West lawman
- Ben Thompson (1843–1884), Old West lawman, gunman, gambler
- J. D. Tippit (1924–1963), Dallas police officer who questioned Lee Harvey Oswald following the assassination of John F. Kennedy and was subsequently killed by Oswald
- Charles Winstead (1891–1973), FBI agent in the 1930s–1940s; one of the agents who shot and killed John Dillinger

== Art, photography, architecture ==
A–K

- David Adickes (1927–2025), sculptor
- Walter W. Ahlschlager (1887–1965), architect
- Larry D. Alexander (born 1953), visual artist
- Natalia Anciso (born 1985), visual artist
- José Arpa (1858–1952), painter
- Tex Avery (1908–1980), animator, cartoonist, director
- Atlee Ayres (1873–1969), architect
- Robert M. Ayres (1898–1977), architect
- Bill Barminski (born 1962), artist, designer, filmmaker
- Michelle Barnes (born 1948), artist, educator, arts administrator
- Donald Barthelme (1907–1996), architect
- Arthello Beck (1941–2004), visual artist
- Bobby Berk (born 1981), interior designer, television personality
- Forrest Bess (1911–1977), painter
- John T. Biggers (1924–2001), muralist, established art department at Texas Southern University
- Electra Waggoner Biggs (1912–2001), sculptor
- Rora Blue (born c. 1996), visual artist
- Melinda Bordelon (1949–1995), painter, illustrator
- Berkeley Breathed (born 1957), Pulitzer Prize-winning cartoonist, author/illustrator, director, screenwriter
- Susan Budge (born 1959), ceramic sculptor
- Harold Dow Bugbee (1900–1963), artist
- John Cassaday (1971–2024), comic book artist
- Keith Carter (born 1948), photographer, educator, artist
- John S. Chase (1925–2012), architect
- Mel Chin (born 1951), conceptual visual artist
- Harold F. Clayton (1954–2015), sculptor
- Nicholas Joseph Clayton (1840–1916), architect
- Matchett Herring Coe (1907–1999), sculptor
- Pompeo Coppini (1870–1957), sculptor, teacher
- George Dahl (1894–1987), architect
- Gabriel Dawe (born 1973), artist
- Dawson Dawson-Watson (1864–1939), impressionist painter
- Charles August Albert Dellschau (1830–1923), outsider artist
- Neil Denari (born 1957), architect
- Richard Dominguez (born 1960), comic book artist
- Donray (born 1945), visual artist
- Brian Adam Douglas (born 1972), visual artist
- Dan Dunn (born 1957), speed painter, cartoonist, caricaturist
- Emily Edwards (1888–1980), artist, historian, conservationist, teacher, civic leader
- Melvin Edwards (1937–2026), sculptor
- Boyd Elder (1944–2018), painter, sculptor
- Charles Fincher (born 1945), cartoonist, lawyer
- Joseph Finger (1887–1953), architect
- Alfred C. Finn (1883–1964), architect
- Pliny Fisk III (born 1944), architect, urban planner, educator
- Marion Fresenius Fooshee (1888–1956), architect
- O'Neil Ford (1905–1982), architect
- Jim Franklin (born 1943), artist, illustrator, underground cartoonist
- Lois Gibson (born c. 1950), forensic artist
- Alfred Giles (1853–1920), architect
- Francois P. Giraud (1818–1877), architect, surveyor, mayor of San Antonio
- Joseph Glasco (1925–1996), abstract expressionist artist
- Rolando Gomez (born 1962), photographer
- Xavier Gonzalez (1898–1993), muralist, sculptor, teacher
- Glenna Goodacre (1939–2020), sculptor, designed obverse of Sacagawea dollar
- James Riely Gordon (1863–1937), architect
- Herbert M. Greene (1871–1932), architect
- Priscilla Hamby (born 1982), illustrator, comic-book artist
- Trenton Doyle Hancock (born 1974), visual artist
- Wyatt C. Hedrick (1888–1964), architect
- Wolf Hilbertz (1938–2007), architect, inventor, marine scientist, educator
- Barbara Hines (born 1950), artist
- Armando Hinojosa (born 1944), sculptor
- Alexandre Hogue (1898–1994), realist painter
- Dorothy Hood (1919–2000), Modernist painter
- Carl Hoppe (1897–1981), painter
- Louis Hoppe (fl. 1860s), 19th-century folk artist
- Lance Hosey (1964–2021), architect
- Letitia Huckaby (born 1972), photographer
- Sedrick Huckaby (born 1975), painter
- Robert H.H. Hugman (1902–1980), architect, designed San Antonio River Walk
- Walter Iooss (born 1943), photographer
- Natalie Irish (born 1982), multimedia artist, pioneer of the lip print technique
- James Ivey (born 1967), artist, painter, carnival surrealism
- Elisa Jimenez (born 1963), interdisciplinary artist, fashion designer
- Luis Jiménez (1940–2006), sculptor
- Raoul Josset (1899–1957), sculptor
- Donald Judd (1928–1994), sculptor
- Karl Kamrath (1911–1988), architect, tennis player
- Cheryl Kelley (born 1968), photorealist painter
- George Kessler (1862–1923), landscape architect, city planner
- John F. Knott (1878–1963), political cartoonist, illustrator, art educator

L–Z

- David Lake, architect
- Thomas C. Lea, III (1907–2001), muralist, illustrator, artist, war correspondent, novelist, historian
- Harold LeDoux (1926–2015), cartoonist, Judge Parker
- Tom Lovell (1852-1911), builder of historic civic architecture
- Rick Lowe (born 1961), visual artist, social activist, educator, MacArthur Fellow
- Hermann Lungkwitz (1813–1891), landscape artist, photographer
- Bonnie MacLeary (1886–1971), sculptor
- Bob Mader (1943–2005), photographer
- Stanley Marsh 3 (1938–2014), millionaire artist and philanthropist
- Florence McClung (1894–1992), painter, printmaker, art teacher
- Marion Koogler McNay (1883–1950), artist, teacher, art collector, museum founder, philanthropist
- Alex McVey (born 1978), illustrator
- Michael Mehaffy (born 1955), architectural theorist
- Wyman Meinzer (born 1950), nature photographer
- Angelbert Metoyer (born 1977), Afrofuturist visual artist
- Donald Moffett (born 1955), painter
- Jesús Moroles (1950–2015), sculptor
- Elisabet Ney (1833–1907), sculptor
- Diane O'Leary (1939–2013), multimedia artist
- Lovie Olivia, multidisciplinary visual artist
- Julian Onderdonk (1882–1922), painter
- Robert Jenkins Onderdonk (1852–1917), painter
- Steve Parker, artist, musician, composer
- Graydon Parrish (born 1970), realist painter
- Harry D. Payne (1891–1987), architect
- John Picacio (born 1969), science fiction-fantasy artist, illustrator
- Dan Piraro (born 1958), painter, illustrator, cartoonist
- Thomas M. Price (1916–1998), architect
- Robert Pruitt (born 1975), visual artist
- Don Ivan Punchatz (1936–2009), science fiction-fantasy artist, illustrator
- Gregor Punchatz (born 1967), artist/sculptor for video games
- Robert Rauschenberg (1925–2008), painter, sculptor, graphic artist
- Frank Reaugh (1860–1945), painter
- Everette Dixie Reese (1923–1955), photographer, photojournalist
- Ace Reid (1925–1991), cartoonist and humorist
- Lucy Wilson Rice (1874–1963), painter
- Linda Ridgway (born 1947), sculptor, printmaker
- Joe Riley (1964–2007), visual and plastic artist
- Dario Robleto (born 1972), conceptual artist
- Elizabeth Barlow Rogers (born 1936), landscape designer, landscape preservationist, writer
- Jermaine Rogers (born 1972), poster artist
- Nancy Rubins (born 1952), sculptor, installation artist
- Verónica Ruiz de Velasco (born 1968), painter
- Robh Ruppel (born c. 1963), illustrator
- Porfirio Salinas (1910–1973), landscape painter
- Julian Schnabel (born 1951), artist, film director
- Emil Schuhmann (1856–1937), folk artist, accordionist, bandleader
- Zachary Selig (1949–2016), artist, painter, writer
- Mark Seliger (born 1959), photographer
- Gilbert Shelton (born 1940), cartoonist
- Erwin E. Smith (1886–1947), photographer
- John F. Staub (1892–1981), architect
- Justin Storms (born 1981), artist, musician, and creator of coloring book The Whaletopian Coloring Book
- James Surls (born 1943), modernist sculptor
- Johnnie Swearingen (1908–1993), artist
- Masaru Takiguchi (born 1941), sculptor, arts educator
- Waldine Tauch (1892–1986), sculptor
- Karen T. Taylor (born 1952), forensic and portrait artist
- Frank Teich (1856–1939), sculptor
- Wilhelm Thielepape (1814–1904), architect, lithographer, photographer, surveyor, attorney, mayor of San Antonio
- Nestor Topchy (born 1963), painter, sculptor, installation artist
- Olin H. Travis (1888–1975), painter, art educator; founded Dallas Art Institute
- Jesse Treviño (1946–2023), visual artist
- Charles Umlauf (1911–1994), sculptor, art educator
- Vincent Valdez (born 1977), artist
- Kathy Vargas (born 1950), artist, photographer
- Salle Werner Vaughn (born 1939), artist
- Gail Vittori (born 1954), urban planner, nonprofit director
- Bob Wade (1943–2019), artist, sculptor in "Cosmic Cowboy" genre
- Pendleton Ward (born 1982), animator, screenwriter, producer, director, voice actor
- William Ward Watkin (1886–1952), architect, founder of Rice University Department of Architecture
- Mack White (born 1952), comic book artist
- Verner Moore White (1863–1923), landscape and portrait artist
- Robert Whiteside (1950–2006), jewelry and craft maker and designer, polymath
- George Rodney Willis (1879–1960), architect
- Laura Wilson (born 1939), photographer
- Robert William Wood (1889–1979), landscape painter
- Bill Zacha (1920–1998), artist, entrepreneur

== Literature ==
A–G

- Jeff Abbott (born 1963), mystery novelist
- Ramon Frederick Adams (1889–1976), western folklorist, musician, candy maker
- Susan Wittig Albert (born 1940), mystery writer
- Mildred Vorpahl Baass (1917–2012), poet
- Karle Wilson Baker (1878–1960), poet, author
- Wendy Barker (1942–2023), poet, educator
- Neal Barrett Jr. (1929–2014), science fiction-fantasy writer
- Barbara Barrie (1931–2026), author of children's books
- Donald Barthelme (1931–1989), writer, educator
- Frederick Barthelme (born 1943), writer, educator
- Steven Barthelme (born 1947), writer, educator
- Rick Bass (born 1958), writer, environmentalist
- Roy Bedichek (1878–1959), writer, naturalist, educator
- Raymond Benson (born 1955), novelist
- Sarah Bird (born 1949), novelist, screenwriter, journalist
- Cheryl Bolen (born 1946), novelist, journalist
- J. Mason Brewer (1896–1975), folklorist, scholar, writer
- Sandra Brown (born 1948), novelist
- James Lee Burke (born 1936), mystery writer
- Hector Cantú (born 1961), writer, editor, newspaper comic strip creator
- Aline B. Carter (1892–1972), poet
- Oscar Casares (born 1964), writer, educator
- Kathryn Casey, mystery and true crime author
- Vivian Cash (1934–2005), first wife of Johnny Cash, published a memoir of their marriage
- Cyrus Cassells (born 1957), poet
- Rosemary Catacalos (1944–2022), poet
- Katherine Center (born 1972), author of chick lit, mommy lit
- Pat Choate (born 1941), author, economist
- Susan Choi (born 1969), novelist
- Sandra Cisneros (born 1954), author and poet
- Tamarie Cooper (born 1970), playwright, actress
- Bill Crider (1941–2018), mystery writer
- Deborah Crombie (born 1952), mystery writer
- Justin Cronin (born 1962), novelist
- Grace Noll Crowell (1877–1969), poet
- James Crumley (1939–2008), crime novelist
- George Dawson (1898–2001), published his autobiography at age 102 after learning to read at 98
- Jan de Hartog (1914–2002), Nobel Prize-nominated author, Tony Award-winning playwright, social activist, philanthropist
- Nephtalí De León (born 1945), writer, poet
- Jim Dent (born 1953), author, sportswriter
- Adina Emilia De Zavala (1861–1955), writer, historian, educator
- J. Frank Dobie (1888–1964), folklorist and writer about open-range days
- Carole Nelson Douglas (1944–2021), mystery writer
- Marianne J. Dyson (born 1955), writer on space science
- Robert M. Edsel (born 1956), nonfiction writer, oil company founder and innovator
- Kurt Eichenwald (born 1961), author, journalist
- John R. Erickson (born 1943), cowboy, author, songwriter, voice actor, wrote Hank the Cowdog series
- Jill Alexander Essbaum (born 1971), poet, writer, professor
- B. H. Fairchild (born 1942), poet
- Kitty Ferguson (born 1941), science writer
- Robert Flynn (born 1932), novelist
- Horton Foote (1916–2009), author and playwright
- Carrie Fountain, poet
- Hans Peter Mareus Neilsen Gammel (1854–1931), editor and publisher of The Laws of Texas 1822–1897
- Julian S. Garcia, writer of Chicano literature
- Bryan A. Garner (born 1958), lexicographer, grammarian, author, educator
- Van G. Garrett, poet, novelist, teacher, photographer
- Fred Gipson (1908–1973), novelist, author of Old Yeller
- Marcus Goodrich (1897–1991), novelist, screenwriter; married Olivia de Havilland
- John Graves (1920–2013), author
- Jesse Edward Grinstead (1866–1948), author of Western fiction
- Laurie Ann Guerrero, poet

H–M

- Christine Hà (born 1979), writer, poet, editor; chef who won MasterChef cooking competition in 2012
- Hardy Haberman (born 1950), author, filmmaker, educator, figure in BDSM culture
- Elizabeth Forsythe Hailey (born 1938), novelist, journalist, playwright
- Harry H. Halsell (1860–1957), rancher, wrote books about ranching life
- Stephen Harrigan (born 1948), novelist, journalist
- Stanley Hauerwas (born 1940), theologian, philosopher
- Bobbie Louise Hawkins (1930–2018), short story writer, monologist, and poet
- Allison Hedge Coke (born 1958), poet and writer
- Harville Hendrix (born 1935), writer, speaker, therapist
- Patricia Highsmith (1921–1995), novelist, author of Strangers on a Train and The Talented Mr. Ripley
- Rolando Hinojosa-Smith (1929–2022), novelist, essayist, poet, educator
- Thomas Elisha Hogg (1842–1880), poet, writer, editor
- Mary Austin Holley (1784–1846), wrote first English-language history of Texas
- Robert E. Howard (1906–1936), author of Conan the Barbarian stories and other pulp adventure tales
- William Humphrey (1924–1997), novelist
- Bret Anthony Johnston (born 1971), author, director of creative writing program at Harvard University
- Mary Karr (born 1955), poet, essayist, memoirist
- Jacqueline Kelly (born 1954), novelist, physician
- Elmer Kelton (1926–2009), journalist, western novelist
- Larry L. King (1929–2012), playwright, journalist, novelist, The Best Little Whorehouse in Texas
- Kevin Kwan (born 1950), novelist
- Joe R. Lansdale (born 1951), author of crime thrillers, Hap and Leonard novels
- Jenny Lawson (born 1973), journalist, humorist, blogger
- Kate Lehrer (born 1939), writer, novelist, reviewer
- Warren Leslie (1927–2011), author, journalist, screenwriter, business executive
- David Liss (born 1966), writer
- Janette Sebring Lowrey (1892–1986), author of children's books, including The Poky Little Puppy
- Max Lucado (born 1955), best-selling Christian author
- Cathy Luchetti (born 1945), author of books about American frontier
- Kirk Lynn (born 1972), playwright, novelist
- Corey Marks (born 1970), poet, educator
- Walt McDonald (1934–2022), poet
- Larry McMurtry (1936–2021), Pulitzer Prize-winning author of Lonesome Dove
- Philipp Meyer (born 1974), novelist
- Vassar Miller (1924–1998), poet
- Michael Moorcock (born 1939), literary and fantasy novelist, musician, journalist
- Pamela Morsi (1951–2024), romance novelist
- Frances Mossiker (1906–1985), author of historical novels
- Jack Elliott Myers (1941–2009), poet

N–Z

- Lisa Niemi (born 1956), writer, dancer, choreographer, actress, director
- Naomi Shihab Nye (born 1952), poet, songwriter, novelist
- Marc Ostrofsky (born 1961), author, entrepreneur, investor
- William A. Owens (1905–1990), author, folklorist, educator
- Greg Pak (born 1968), comic-book writer, film director
- Americo Paredes (1915–1999), author of books on life along U.S.-Mexican border
- Deborah Paredez (born 1970), poet
- David M. Parsons (born 1943), poet, educator, 2011 Texas State Poet Laureate
- Stanley G. Payne (born 1934), historian of modern Spain and European Fascism
- Emmy Pérez, poet
- George Sessions Perry (1910–1956), novelist, correspondent
- Rachel Plummer (1818–1839), wrote a sensational account of her captivity among Comanches
- Julie Powell (1973–2022), author, blogger, subject of film Julie & Julia
- Hugh Prather (1938–2010), writer, minister, counselor
- Kevin Prufer (born 1969), poet, novelist, educator
- Deanna Raybourn (born 1968), author of historical fiction and historical mysteries
- James Reasoner (born 1953), writer
- Tom Reiss (born 1964), Pulitzer Prize-winning author, historian, journalist
- Rick Riordan (born 1964), novelist
- Tomás Rivera (1935–1984), author, poet, educator
- Lexie Dean Robertson (1893–1954), poet
- Lou Halsell Rodenberger (1926–2009), author, educator, journalist
- Jane Gilmore Rushing (1925–1997), novelist, journalist
- Dorothy Scarborough (1878–1935), author, folklorist
- Robert Schenkkan (born 1953), playwright, screenwriter, actor
- Shea Serrano (born 1981), author, journalist
- Belle Hunt Shortridge (1858–1893), author and poet
- Cynthia Leitich Smith (born 1967), author of fiction for children and young adults
- Terry Southern (1924–1995), author, screenwriter
- Suzy Spencer (born 1954), true crime author, journalist
- John Steakley (1951–2010), science-fiction and fantasy writer
- Carmen Tafolla (born 1951), poet, writer
- Larry D. Thomas (born 1947), 2008 Texas State Poet Laureate
- Lorenzo Thomas (1944–2005), poet, critic, educator
- Jim Thompson (1906–1977), crime novelist
- Thomas Thompson (1933–1982), author, journalist
- Lon Tinkle (1906–1980), author, Texas historian
- Jia Tolentino (born 1988), writer, editor
- Melvin B. Tolson (1898–1966), poet, educator, social activist
- Sergio Troncoso (born 1961), author of The Nature of Truth
- Frederick Turner (1943–2025), poet
- John Varley (1947–2025), science-fiction writer
- Lizzie Velásquez (born 1989), author, motivational speaker, anti-bullying activist
- Vanessa Angélica Villarreal, poet, essayist
- Dale L. Walker (1935–2015), writer
- Bryan Washington (born 1993), writer
- Walter Prescott Webb (1888–1963), author, historian
- Scott Westerfeld (born 1963), writer
- Martha E. Whitten (1842–1917), author, poet, hymnist
- Marianne Williamson (born 1952), author, social activist, 2020 U.S. presidential candidate
- Janice Woods Windle (born 1938), author of historical novels
- Ruthe Lewin Winegarten (1929–2004), author, editor, historian, social activist
- Kim Wozencraft (born 1954), writer
- Monica Youn (born 1971), poet, lawyer
- Dean Young (1955–2022), poet
- Gwendolyn Zepeda (born 1971), poet, author
- Joaquin Zihuatanejo (Royce Johnson) (born 1971), poet

== Journalism ==
A–D

- Wick Allison (1948–2020), magazine owner and publisher, author
- Ike Altgens (1919–1995), photojournalist, reporter
- Brian Anderson (born 1971), sportscaster
- Alfred O. Andersson (1874–1950), newspaper publisher
- Jim Angle (1946–2022), chief Washington correspondent for Fox News
- Ole Anthony (1938–2021), investigative journalist, magazine editor
- John Ardoin (1935–2001), music critic and author
- Hugh Aynesworth (1931–2023), journalist, investigative reporter, authority on the assassination of John F. Kennedy
- Ralph Baker Jr. (1945–2008), radio host
- Cecilia Ballí (born 1976), journalist, anthropologist
- Eddie Barker (1927–2012), television news reporter
- Dave Barnett (born 1958), sportscaster
- Skip Bayless (born 1951), sportswriter
- Michelle Beadle (born 1975), sports reporter for ESPN and NBCUniversal
- Paul Begala (born 1961), Democratic political consultant, political commentator
- Alfred Horatio Belo (1839–1901), newspaper founder
- Joshua Benton (born 1975), newspaper reporter and columnist, educator
- Michael Berry (born 1970), conservative talk-radio host in Houston
- Kevin Blackistone (born 1959), sportswriter
- Bill Blair (1921–2014), newspaper founder and publisher, Negro league baseball player
- Brandon Boyer (born 1977), blog editor
- Pat Boyette (1923–2000), radio journalist, comic book artist
- Billy Lee Brammer (1929–1978), journalist, novelist, political staffer
- William Cowper Brann (1855–1898), journalist, iconoclastic writer
- Marie Brenner (born 1949), investigative journalist, writer
- Joe Bob Briggs (John Bloom) (born 1953), film critic
- Barrett Brown (born 1981), journalist, essayist, satirist, activist; served time in federal prison for facilitating email leaks
- John Henry Brown (1820–1895), historian, newspaper founder and editor, politician
- Lance Brown (born 1972), television sportscaster, NFL football player
- Samantha Brown (born 1970), television host
- Bryan Burrough (born 1961), journalist, author
- Gail Caldwell (born 1951), chief book critic for The Boston Globe
- Liz Carpenter (1920–2010), writer, feminist, reporter, media advisor, speechwriter, political humorist, public relations expert
- Al Carrell (1925–2014), home-improvement columnist, radio host
- Al Carter (born 1952), sports journalist
- Amon G. Carter (1879–1955), newspaper founder and publisher
- Cheryl Casone (born 1970), Fox Business Network anchor
- Elizabeth Chambers (born 1982), television host and news reporter for Current TV
- Morgan Chesky (born 1986), NBC News correspondent
- Craig Cohen (born 1972), broadcast journalist, radio host
- Dan Cook (1926–2008), sportswriter, sportscaster
- Ron Corning (born 1971), television news anchor
- Tim Cowlishaw (born 1955), sportswriter
- Candice Crawford (born 1986), KDAF reporter
- Walter Cronkite (1916–2009), CBS News anchor
- Jim Cummins (1945–2007), NBC News reporter
- Don Dahler (born 1960), journalist, writer, correspondent for CBS News
- Eugene Daniels (born 1989), political journalist, White House correspondent
- Corby Davidson (born 1969), sports radio personality
- Mark Davis (born 1957), conservative talk-show host, newspaper columnist
- Edward Musgrove Dealey (1892–1969), journalist, newspaper publisher
- George B. Dealey (1859–1946), newspaper publisher
- Jody Dean (born 1959), radio journalist, author
- Dayna Devon (born 1970), television journalist
- Sam Donaldson (born 1934), ABC News reporter
- Ronnie Dugger (1930–2025), progressive journalist
- Troy Dungan (born 1936), television meteorologist
- George Dunham (born 1965), radio personality, sportscaster
- Richard Dyer (1941–2024), classical music critic for The Boston Globe

E–J

- Kurt Eichenwald (born 1961), investigative reporter, author
- Linda Ellerbee (born 1944), journalist, correspondent, reporter
- Gene Elston (1922–2015), sportscaster
- Fred Faour (1964–2024), radio talk show host
- John Henry Faulk (1913–1990), storyteller and radio broadcaster
- T. R. Fehrenbach (1925–2013), newspaper columnist, historian
- Ashley Feinberg (born 1990), journalist, humorist
- Shannon Fife (1888–1972), journalist, humorist, screenwriter
- Robert Flores (born 1970), ESPN Sports anchor
- Ron Franklin (1942–2022), sportscaster
- Kinky Friedman (1944–2024), columnist, singer-songwriter, novelist, candidate for governor of Texas
- Randy Galloway (born 1943), radio host, newspaper columnist
- Kyle Gann (born 1955), music critic, composer, musicologist
- George Gimarc (born 1957), radio announcer, disc jockey, producer
- Frank Glieber (1934–1985), sportscaster
- Bianna Golodryga (born 1978), television journalist
- Patricia Gras (born 1960), television news anchor, producer
- John Howard Griffin (1920–1980), journalist, author
- Oscar Griffin Jr. (1933–2011), newspaper editor, won Pulitzer Prize for uncovering Billie Sol Estes scandal
- Jesse Edward Grinstead (1866–1948), founder of The Kerrville Mountain Sun
- Jenna Bush Hager (born 1981), television news personality, writer
- Leon Hale (1921–2021), journalist, author
- Jane Hall (born 1951), former Fox News pundit, Fox News Watch, The O'Reilly Factor
- Tamron Hall (born 1970), MSNBC daytime anchor
- Grace Halsell (1923–2000), journalist, writer
- Milo Hamilton (1927–2015), sportscaster
- Dale Hansen (born 1948), sportscaster
- Stephen Harrigan (born 1948), journalist, novelist
- Houston Harte (1893–1972), co-founder of Harte-Hanks chain of newspapers
- Christy Haubegger (born 1968), founder of Latina magazine
- Heloise (mother) (1919–1977), syndicated columnist
- Heloise (daughter) (born 1951), syndicated columnist
- Kate Heyhoe (born 1955), food writer
- Dave Hickey (1938–2021), art critic
- R.C. Hickman (c. 1922–2007), photojournalist
- Norm Hitzges (born 1944), sportscaster, reporter
- Skip Hollandsworth (born 1957), journalist, screenwriter, magazine editor
- Mark Holtz (1945–1997), sportscaster
- Karen Elliott House (born 1947), journalist, publishing and business executive
- Deborah Howell (1941–2010), newspaper editor
- June Hunt (born 1944), radio host of religious programs
- Jovita Idar (1885–1946), journalist, civil rights activist
- Molly Ivins (1944–2007), political commentator, liberal journalist, and author
- Robert H. Jackson (born 1934), newspaper photographer, won Pulitzer Prize
- Dahr Jamail (born 1968), journalist
- Craig James (born 1961), sports commentator on ABC and ESPN
- Dan Jenkins (1928–2019), sportswriter and author
- Sally Jenkins (born 1960), sports columnist and feature writer for The Washington Post, and author
- Iola Johnson (born 1950), television news anchor, first African-American anchor in the Southwest
- Kenneth P. Johnson (1934–2008), newspaper editor
- Penn Jones Jr. (1914–1998), newspaper journalist, John F. Kennedy assassination conspiracy theorist
- Richard Justice, sportswriter

K–O

- Todd Kalas (born 1965), sportscaster
- Gordon Keith (born 1971), radio personality
- Steven G. Kellman (born 1947), literary critic, columnist, author, educator
- Stan Kelly, radio news anchor, public address announcer
- Hubert Renfro Knickerbocker (1898–1949), journalist, author
- Harry Koch (1867–1942), newspaper founder, railroad founder
- Kidd Kraddick (1959–2013), radio host
- Priya Krishna (born 1991), food writer, YouTube personality
- Aaron Latham (1943–2022), journalist, writer
- Jim Lehrer (1934–2020), television journalist, author
- Michael R. Levy (born 1946), magazine founder and publisher
- Josh Lewin (born 1968), sportscaster
- Marjorie Herrera Lewis (born 1957), sports reporter, author
- Verne Lundquist (born 1940), sportscaster, reporter
- Bill Macatee (born 1955), sportscaster, reporter
- Marlin Maddoux (1933–2004), radio talk show host
- Debra Maffett (born 1956), host of TNN Country News, Miss America 1983
- Dan Malone (born 1955), Pulitzer Prize-winning investigative reporter
- Ernie Manouse (born 1969), television host, radio personality, writer, producer
- Amanda Marcotte (born 1977), feminist/liberal blogger
- Chris Marrou (born 1947), television news anchor
- Jim Marrs (1943–2017), journalist, author
- Roland Martin (born 1968), journalist, syndicated columnist, CNN commentator
- Russ Martin (1960–2021), radio host
- Anita Martini (1939–1993), sports journalist
- Tex Maule (1915–1981), sportswriter
- Mary Maverick (1818–1898), memoirist
- John McCaa (born 1954), television news anchor
- Kevin McCarthy, radio and television announcer
- Gordon McLendon (1921–1986), radio pioneer, innovator, entrepreneur
- Howard McNeil (1920–2010), television meteorologist
- Lisa McRee (born 1961), television journalist
- Sonny Melendrez (born 1946), radio personality, voice actor
- Curt Menefee (born 1965), sportscaster, reporter
- Bill Mercer (1926–2025), sportscaster
- Maxine Mesinger (1925–2001), gossip columnist
- Harry J. Middleton (1921–2017), journalist, presidential speechwriter, educator
- Dale Milford (1926–1997), television meteorologist, U.S. representative
- Larry Monroe (1942–2014), radio personality
- Margaret Moser (1954–2017), journalist, music critic
- Leslie Mouton (born 1965), news reporter
- Bill Moyers (1934–2025), journalist, political commentator, White House press secretary
- Eric Nadel (born 1951), sportscaster
- James Pearson Newcomb (1837–1907), newspaper journalist, publisher; secretary of state of Texas
- Chau Nguyen (born 1973), television news anchor
- Jim O'Brien (1939–1983), reporter, disc jockey
- Norah O'Donnell (born 1974), commentator on The Today Show and MSNBC correspondent
- Barbara Olson (1955–2001), Fox News and CNN commentator

P–Z

- Albert Parsons (1848–1887), newspaper editor, socialist, anarchist; was convicted of conspiracy and hanged
- Loel Passe (1917–1997), sportscaster
- Marjorie Paxson (1923–2017), newspaper journalist, editor, publisher
- Scott Pelley (born 1957), anchor and managing editor of the CBS Evening News
- Uma Pemmaraju (1958–2022), anchor for Fox News
- Bob Phillips (born 1951), creator, producer, and host of Texas Country Reporter
- Michael Phillips (born 1960), journalist, historian, author, educator
- Stone Phillips (born 1954), co-anchor of Dateline NBC
- Katherine Anne Porter (1890–1980), journalist, essayist, novelist
- Cactus Pryor (1923–2011), radio personality, actor
- John Quiñones (born 1952), ABC News correspondent
- Dan Rather (born 1931), former CBS Evening News anchor
- Richard Ray (born 1950), television journalist
- Julia Scott Reed (1917–2004), newspaper columnist, reporter, editor
- Rex Reed (1938–2026), movie critic
- Dick Risenhoover (1927–1978), sportscaster
- Tracy Rowlett (born 1942), television news anchor
- Jan Jarboe Russell (1951–2026), journalist, writer
- Ruben Salazar (1928–1970), reporter, Chicano activist, killed during a Chicano Moratorium march
- John Phillip Santos (born 1957), journalist, author, filmmaker, producer
- Bob Schieffer (born 1937), CBS Evening News anchor
- Elliot Segal (born 1969), talk radio host
- Brad Sham (born 1949), sportscaster
- Blackie Sherrod (1919–2016), sportswriter
- Bud Shrake (1931–2009), sportswriter, author
- William Dean Singleton (born 1951), newspaper publishing executive, chairman of the board of Associated Press
- Evan Smith (born 1966), magazine editor, television, radio, internet journalist
- Liz Smith (1923–2017), syndicated columnist
- Joshua Starnes (born 1976), film critic
- Marc Stein, sports reporter
- Ron Stone (1936–2008), television news reporter
- Linda Stouffer (born 1970), television news anchor
- Clinton Howard Swindle (1945–2004), investigative newspaper journalist, author
- Harold Taft (1922–1991), television meteorologist
- Thomas Thompson (1933–1982), investigative journalist for Life magazine, author
- Emma Tiedemann, sports announcer
- Bascom N. Timmons (1890–1987), opened news bureau in Washington; native of Amarillo
- Jack Tinsley (1935–2004), newspaper executive editor
- Frank X. Tolbert (1912–1984), author, historian, journalist, restaurateur
- Karen Tumulty (born 1955), newspaper correspondent
- Charlie Van Dyke (born 1947), former radio disc jockey of KLIF, known for the best voice of radio and television stations across America; former frequent guest host of American Top 40, 1983–1988
- Rob Walker (born 1968), journalist, author
- Todd Wagner (born 1960), internet broadcasting pioneer
- Robb Walsh, food writer, restaurant owner
- Dave Ward (1939–2025), television newscaster
- Greg Williams (born 1960), sports radio host
- Robert Wilonsky (born 1968), newspaper columnist, critic
- Carlo Wolff (born 1943), journalist
- Bill Worrell (born 1947), sportscaster
- Lawrence Wright (born 1947), journalist, author of The Looming Tower
- Robert Wright (born 1957), journalist
- Bobbie Wygant (1926–2024), television journalist and host
- Marvin Zindler (1921–2007), television journalist

== Science, including medicine ==
A–K

- Muthu Alagappan (born c. 1990), sports statistician
- James P. Allison (born 1948), immunologist, won Nobel Prize
- Jean Apgar (born 1936), biochemist
- Nima Arkani-Hamed (born 1972), theoretical physicist
- Ryan S. Baker (born 1977), computer scientist
- Edmund F. Baroch (1934–2022), metallurgist
- Brady Barr (born 1963), herpetologist
- Charles R. Baxter (1929–2005), emergency-room physician who attended President John F. Kennedy following Kennedy's assassination
- R. Palmer Beasley (1936–2012), physician, public health educator, epidemiologist
- Angela Belcher (born 1967), materials scientist, biological engineer, MIT professor, MacArthur Fellow
- Bruce Beutler (born 1957), Nobel Prize-winning immunologist, geneticist
- James R. Biard (1931–2022), electrical engineer; invented the GaAs infrared light-emitting diode (LED), the optical isolator, the Schottky transistor, and MOS ROM
- R. H. Bing (1914–1986), mathematician
- Gail Borden (1801–1874), inventor of condensed milk and other foodstuffs, surveyor, publisher
- Edward Boyden (born 1979), neuroscientist, MIT professor
- Otis Boykin (1920–1982), inventor and engineer
- T. Berry Brazelton (1918–2018), pediatrician, author, syndicated columnist
- Michael Glyn Brown (1957–2013), hand surgeon
- Michael Stuart Brown (born 1941), Nobel Prize-winning geneticist
- John Cacioppo (1951–2018), co-founder of social neuroscience
- Robert Cade (1927–2007), physician, scientist; inventor of Gatorade
- William H. Cade (1946–2025), zoologist, evolutionary biologist, authority on mating systems of Orthoptera
- Paul C. W. Chu (born 1941), physicist, leading authority on superconductivity
- Denton Cooley (1920–2016), pioneering heart surgeon
- Kenneth H. Cooper (born 1931), physician, developed concept of aerobic exercise
- Marjorie Corcoran (1950–2017), physicist
- Robert Curl (1933–2022), Nobel Prize-winning chemist
- Michael E. DeBakey (1908–2008), pioneering heart surgeon
- Everette Lee DeGolyer (1886–1956), geophysicist, philanthropist
- Robert Dennard (1932–2024), computer scientist and inventor
- Bryce DeWitt (1923–2004), physicist, co-developed Wheeler–DeWitt equation ("wave function of the Universe")
- Cécile DeWitt-Morette (1922–2017), physicist, mathematician
- Leonard Eugene Dickson (1874–1954), mathematician
- James "Red" Duke (1928–2015), physician, professor, journalist
- J. Doyne Farmer (born 1952), complex systems scientist, entrepreneur, Oxford mathematics professor
- Ralph Feigin (1938–2008), pediatrician, writer, educator, hospital administrator
- Leroy S. Fletcher (born 1936), mechanical and aerospace engineer
- John Fordtran (1931–2025), gastroenterologist, educator
- Dan Foster (1930–2018), physician, diabetes researcher, educator
- Peter T. Fox, neurologist, neuroimaging researcher
- Gordon J. Freeman, immunologist, oncologist
- Alfred G. Gilman (1941–2015), Nobel Prize-winning pharmacologist, biochemist, educator
- Joseph L. Goldstein (born 1940), Nobel Prize-winning geneticist, biochemist
- John B. Goodenough (1922–2023), Nobel Prize-winning materials scientist, solid-state physicist, professor
- Cecil Howard Green (1900–2003), geophysicist, founder of Texas Instruments, philanthropist
- Gerald D. Griffin (born 1934), aeronautical engineer, NASA official
- G.B. Halsted (1853–1922), mathematician
- Aubrey Otis Hampton (1900–1955), radiologist
- David Hanson (born 1969), roboticist
- J. William Harbour (born 1963), ophthalmologist, ocular oncologist
- Elise Harmon (1909–1985), physicist, chemist, electronics engineer
- Meredith Hay (born 1962), biomedical researcher
- John Haynes Jr. (1937–2021), rural family physician, national recognition as Country Doctor of the Year
- George H. Heilmeier (1936–2014), engineer, contributed to invention of LCDs; chief technical officer at Texas Instruments
- Robert T. Hill (1858–1941), geologist
- Helen Hobbs (born 1952), molecular geneticist, physician, professor
- Peter Hotez (born 1958), pediatrician, virologist, educator
- Sarah Blaffer Hrdy (born 1946), anthropologist, primatologist
- M. King Hubbert (1903–1989), geophysicist
- Lane P. Hughston (born 1951), mathematician, physicist, scholar and professor of mathematical finance
- Nathan Isgur (1947–2001), theoretical physicist
- Ronny Jackson (born 1967), Physician to the President of the United States
- Mildred Fay Jefferson (1927–2010), physician, political activist; first African-American woman to graduate from Harvard Medical School
- Carl Jockusch (born 1941), mathematician
- Mavis Kelsey (1912–2013), physician who founded the Kelsey-Seybold Clinic, professor, writer, philanthropist
- Jack Kilby (1923–2005), Nobel Prize-winning electrical engineer; invented integrated circuit, handheld calculator, thermal printer
- Riki Kobayashi (1924–2013), professor of chemical engineering
- Billy Koen (1938–2025), nuclear and chemical engineer, professor
- Edwin Jackson Kyle (1876–1963), agriculture expert, professor, ambassador; Kyle Field and Kyle, Texas are named for him

L–Z

- Thelma Patten Law (1900–1968), first African American woman admitted to the Harris County Medical Society
- Duy-Loan Le (born 1962), engineer, first woman and first Asian Texas Instruments Senior Fellow
- Ferdinand Lindheimer (1801–1879), botanist
- R. Bowen Loftin (born 1949), physicist, computer scientist, educator, university president
- Cyrus Longworth Lundell (1907–1994), botanist, archaeologist; discovered several Mayan cities in Mexican jungle
- Larry Masinter (born 1949), computer scientist, internet pioneer
- Walter McAfee (1914–1995), astronomer
- Henry Cecil McBay (1914–1995), chemist, educator
- Eugene McDermott (1899–1973), geophysicist, founder of Texas Instruments, philanthropist
- Jerry Merryman (1932–2019), electrical engineer, co-invented hand-held calculator
- John S. Meyer (1924–2011), neurologist, medical-school professor and administrator
- C. Wright Mills (1916–1962), prominent political sociologist and author
- Forrest Mims (born 1944), amateur scientist, popular science writer
- Carl Mitcham (born 1941), philosopher of science, professor, writer
- W. E. Moerner (born 1953), chemist, professor
- Oscar Monnig (1902–1999), astronomer and meteoricist
- Robert Lee Moore (1882–1974), mathematician, educator
- Matt Mullenweg (born 1984), developed WordPress software
- Hermann Joseph Muller (1890–1967), Nobel Prize-winning geneticist
- Joseph Nagyvary (born 1934), biochemist, violin maker, Stradivarius researcher
- Xalavier Nelson Jr. (born c. 1997), video game developer
- Leonard L. Northrup Jr. (1918–2016), engineer, inventor, entrepreneur
- Peter Ozsváth (born 1967), mathematician
- Theophilus Painter (1889–1969), zoologist, professor, university president
- Sujal Parikh (1985–2010), global health advocate
- John Park (1814–1872), inventor, construction materials expert, builder
- Percy Pennybacker (1895–1963), civil engineer, innovator of bridge design
- Victor Poor (1933–2012), as technical director at Datapoint in San Antonio, led design of the Intel 8008 microprocessor chip
- Ilya Prigogine (1917–2003), Nobel Prize-winning physicist and chemist
- Robert Rohde, physicist
- Harold E. Rohrschach Jr. (1926–1993), physics professor
- Margaret Hutchinson Rousseau (1911–2000), chemical engineer; designed the first commercial penicillin production plant
- Nikos Salingaros (born 1952), mathematician, physicist, architectural theorist, urban theorist
- Donald Seldin (1920–2018), nephrologist, referred to as the "intellectual father of University of Texas Southwestern Medical Center"
- Robert Simpson (1912–2014), meteorologist, hurricane specialist
- Oliver R. Smoot (born 1940), expert on standards of measurement, namesake of smoot unit of length
- Clyde Snow (1928–2014), forensic anthropologist
- John Stapp (1910–1999), Air Force officer, researched human transport and safety
- Michael Starbird (born 1948), mathematician, educator
- E. C. George Sudarshan (1931–2018), physicist, author, University of Texas professor
- John Tate (1925–2019), mathematician, Wolf Prize in Mathematics
- Robert Taylor (1932–2017), Internet pioneer; won National Medal of Technology, Draper Prize
- Gordon Teal (1907–2003), electrical engineer known for developing the first silicon transistor
- Alice Y. Ting (born 1974), chemist, MIT professor
- Beatrice Tinsley (1941–1981), astronomer
- Catalina Trail (born 1949), amateur naturalist, social worker
- Karen Uhlenbeck (born 1942), mathematician, National Medal of Science
- Aureliano Urrutia (1872–1975), physician
- Harry Vandiver (1882–1973), mathematician
- Abraham Verghese (born 1955), physician, educator, author
- Michael Viscardi (born 1989), mathematician
- Hubert Stanley Wall (1902–1971), mathematician, educator
- Steven Weinberg (1933–2021), Nobel Prize-winning physicist
- Spencer Wells (born 1969), geneticist and anthropologist
- Fred Wendorf (1924–2015), anthropologist
- John A. Wheeler (1911–2008), physicist, Wolf Prize in Physics, coined the term 'black hole'
- Mary Wheeler (born 1938), mathematician
- Kern Wildenthal (born 1941), physician, medical administrator
- Quentin Wilson (1942–2019), engineer, one of the "Rocket Boys" portrayed in a 1990s book and film
- Robert Woodrow Wilson (born 1936), Nobel Prize-winning physicist, astronomer
- Lloyd Youngblood (born 1946), neurosurgeon

== Aviation and space exploration ==
- John Aaron (born 1943), NASA engineer, flight controller
- William Anders (1933–2024), Apollo program astronaut
- Anousheh Ansari (born 1966 in Mashhad, Iran), first female space tourist
- Jeffrey Ashby (born 1954), astronaut
- Alan Bean (1932–2018), astronaut
- John E. Blaha (born 1942), astronaut
- David Harold Byrd (1900–1986), founder of Civil Air Patrol, oilman
- Eugene Cernan (1934–2017), astronaut, walked on moon; lived most of his life in Texas
- Kenneth Cockrell (born 1950), astronaut
- Aaron Cohen (1931–2010), director of NASA's Lyndon B. Johnson Space Center
- Bessie "Queen Bess" Coleman (1892–1926), first African American female aviator
- Douglas "Wrong Way" Corrigan (1907–1995), aviator
- John Oliver Creighton (born 1943), astronaut
- Robert Crippen (born 1937), astronaut
- John M. Fabian (1939–2026), astronaut
- William Frederick Fisher (born 1946), astronaut
- Patrick G. Forrester (born 1957), astronaut
- Benjamin Foulois (1879–1967), pioneering military aviator
- Edward Givens (1930–1967), astronaut
- Gerald D. Griffin (born 1934), director of Johnson Space Center, aeronautical engineer
- Bernard A. Harris Jr. (born 1956), astronaut
- Al Haynes (1931–2019), airline pilot, saved numerous lives in 1989 crash landing of crippled DC-10
- Gary L. Herod (1929–1961), Texas Air National Guard pilot who stayed with his plane as it crashed, to avoid residential areas
- Paul Hill (born 1962), Director of Mission Operations at NASA's Lyndon B. Johnson Space Center
- Donald Holmquest (born 1939), astronaut
- Howard Hughes (1905–1976), billionaire playboy, entrepreneur and aviation pioneer
- Millie Hughes-Fulford (1945–2021), astronaut
- Rick Husband (1957–2003), commander of the Space Shuttle Columbia, killed in its crash
- Robert S. Kimbrough (born 1967), astronaut
- Timothy Kopra (born 1963), astronaut
- Paul Lockhart (born 1956), astronaut
- Ormer Locklear (1891–1920), stunt flyer
- Edgar Mitchell (1930–2016), astronaut
- Richard Mullane (born 1945), astronaut
- Arthur W. Murray (1918–2011), test pilot
- Loral O'Hara (born 1983), astronaut
- John D. Olivas (born 1965), NASA astronaut of Mexican descent, flew aboard the Space Shuttle Atlantis (STS-117) in June 2007
- Wiley Post (1898–1935), first pilot to fly solo around the world
- James F. Reilly (born 1954), astronaut
- David Scott (born 1932), astronaut
- Elliot See (1927–1966), astronaut
- Katherine Stinson (1891–1977), pioneering female aviator
- Chesley "Sully" Sullenberger (born 1951), airline pilot, safely landed US Airways Flight 1549 on the Hudson River after a bird strike
- Ed Swearingen (1925–2014), aeronautical engineer
- Jerri Sloan Truhill (1929–2013), aviator, member of Mercury 13
- Shannon Walker (born 1965), astronaut, physicist
- Azellia White (1913–2019), first African-American woman to earn a pilot's license in Texas
- Ed White (1930–1967), first American astronaut to walk in space
- Jeana Yeager (born 1952), broke distance records during nonstop flight around the world in the experimental Voyager airplane

== Scholars, educators, academicians ==
See also the listings on this page for individual areas of specialization (e.g., Literature, Science/medicine, Music)

A–K

- R. J. Q. Adams (born 1943), professor of British history at Texas A&M University
- Theodore Albrecht (1945–2025), music historian, educator
- L.C. (Laurine Cecil) Anderson (1853–1938), educator
- Cecilia Ballí (born 1976), anthropologist, professor, journalist
- Jacques Barzun (1907–2012), historian, philosopher, recipient of Presidential Medal of Freedom
- ZerNona Black (1906–2005), civil rights activist, educator
- Hiram Abiff Boaz (1866–1962), university president, bishop
- H. W. Brands (born 1953), historian, author, professor at University of Texas
- Dee Brock (1930–2026), educator, model, cheerleading director
- Brené Brown (born 1965), scholar, researcher, and University of Houston professor of social work
- Kate Moore Brown (1871–1945), first public-school music teacher in Texas, helped form several arts organizations
- Robert A. Brown (born 1951), president of Boston University, chemical engineer
- Walter L. Buenger (born 1951), historian
- Robert D. Bullard (born 1946), professor, university administrator
- Rufus Columbus Burleson (1823–1901), president of Baylor University, minister
- Norma V. Cantu (born 1954), civil rights lawyer, educator
- Marcia Citron (born 1945), musicologist, professor
- Christine Comer (born 1950), Director of Science in the curriculum division of the Texas Education Agency; resigned amid controversy
- Louise Cowan (1916–2015), liberal arts scholar, professor, critic
- Jennifer Cowley (born 1974), urban planner, president of University of Texas at Arlington
- Light Townsend Cummins (born 1946), historian, educator
- Adina Emilia De Zavala (1861–1955), teacher, historian, Texas history preservationist
- Ramón H. Dovalina (born 1943), president of Laredo Community College, 1995–2007
- T. R. Fehrenbach (1925–2013), historian, newspaper columnist
- Peter T. Flawn (1926–2017), president of University of Texas at Austin
- Dan Flores (born 1948), historian of the American West
- Joe Bertram Frantz (1917–1993), historian
- Julia Caldwell Frazier (1863–1929), educator
- Thomas Freeman (1919–2020), debate coach
- W. C. Friley (1845–1911), first president of Hardin–Simmons University, 1892–1894
- Marilyn Gambrell (born 1953), parole officer turned teacher who started the program No More Victims in Houston to assist children with incarcerated parents
- Kyle Gann (born 1955), musicologist, composer, music critic
- Juliet V. García (born 1949), university president, was awarded Presidential Medal of Freedom
- Bryan A. Garner (born 1958), lexicographer, grammarian, author, educator
- Annette Gordon-Reed (born 1958), historian, author, professor
- Norman Washington Harllee (c. 1847–1927), educator
- Anna Harriet Heyer (1909–2002), musicologist, music librarian, bibliographer
- Harold Hoehner (1935–2009), theologian, author, professor
- Roy Hofheinz Jr. (1935–2023), sinologist, professor at Harvard University
- William Curry Holden (1896–1993), historian, archaeologist, educator, museum director
- John Holmes Jenkins (1940–1989), historian, antiquarian bookseller, publisher, poker player
- Bret Anthony Johnston (born 1971), author, director of creative writing program at Harvard University
- Shirley Strum Kenny (1934–2026), English scholar, university president
- V. O. Key Jr. (1908–1963), political scientist, Ivy League professor
- Lucy Ann Kidd-Key (1839–1916), educator, college administrator
- Wendy Kopp (born 1967), founder and president of Teach For America
- Arnold Krammer (1941–2018), historian of Germany and the United States; retired professor at Texas A&M University

L–Z

- Umphrey Lee (1893–1958), Methodist pastor, president of Southern Methodist University
- Charles LeMaistre (1924–2017), physician, chancellor of University of Texas System
- Alan Lomax (1915–2002), folk singer, guitarist, ethnomusicologist, folklorist
- John Lomax (1867–1948), musicologist, folklorist
- Edgar Odell Lovett (1871–1957), educator, college administrator, first president of Rice University
- Alejandro L. Madrid (born 1968), music scholar, educator
- Juan L. Maldonado (1948–2018), president of Laredo Community College since 2007
- Charles R. Matthews (born 1939), former Texas Railroad Commissioner and chancellor-emeritus of the Texas State University System
- Mack McCormick (1930–2015), musicologist, folklorist
- Robert D. McTeer (born c. 1943), economist, president of the Federal Reserve Bank of Dallas
- Francis Joseph Mullin (1906–1997), president of Shimer College
- Barry Munitz (born 1941), corporation and foundation executive, chancellor of University of Houston System and California State University System
- Gene Nichol (born 1951), president of the College of William & Mary
- Leonidas Warren Payne Jr. (1873–1945), linguist, folklorist, English professor
- Shanna Peeples (born 1965) National Teacher of the Year, 2015; scholar, author
- Anna Pennybacker (1861–1938), educator, author, social activist
- Ben H. Procter (1927–2012), historian at Texas Christian University in Fort Worth, 1957–2000
- Ricardo Romo (born 1943), president of University of Texas at San Antonio
- Lawrence Sullivan "Sul" Ross (1838–1898), Confederate general, governor of Texas, president of Texas A&M University, namesake of Sul Ross State University
- John Silber (1926–2012), president and chancellor of Boston University
- Ruth J. Simmons (born 1945), first female African-American president of a major college (Smith College), first African-American president of an Ivy League college (Brown University)
- Thomas Vernor Smith (1890–1964), philosopher, scholar, educator, U.S. representative
- Jerry D. Thompson (born 1943), historian of Texas and the Southwestern United States
- Leon Toubin (1928–2025), Jewish civic leader, philanthropist, and historian
- Decherd Turner (1922–2002), bibliophile, book collector, librarian, minister
- Henrietta Bell Wells (1912–2008), educator, debater, social worker
- Clara Belle Williams (1885–1993), educator
- Sudie L. Williams (1872–1940), music educator
- Roger L. Worsley (born 1937), president of Laredo Community College, 1985–1995
- Susan Youens (born 1947), musicologist, music professor, author
- Mark Yudof (born 1944), law professor, university chancellor

== Religion and clergy ==
A–M

- Charles L. Allen (1913–2005), Methodist minister
- Kathleen Baskin-Ball (1958–2008), Methodist
- Gregory Beale (born 1949), biblical scholar
- Norman A. Beck (born 1933), Lutheran pastor, professor
- Mary C. Billings (1824–1904), Universalist
- Claude Black (1916–2009), Baptist
- Hiram Abiff Boaz (1866–1962), Methodist Episcopal bishop, college president
- Edmond L. Browning (1929–2016), Episcopal bishop
- C. L. Bryant (born 1956), Baptist minister, Conservative media personality
- Kirbyjon Caldwell (born 1953), Methodist
- Benajah Harvey Carroll (1843–1914), Baptist
- Henry Cohen (1863–1952), Jewish
- Kenneth Copeland (born 1936), Pentecostal
- W. A. Criswell (1909–2002), Baptist
- Finis Alonzo Crutchfield Jr. (1911–1987), Methodist bishop
- Rafael Cruz (born 1939), Cuban-born preacher, and father of Texas Senator Ted Cruz (moved to Texas from Calgary, Alberta, Canada)
- John B. Denton (1806–1841), Methodist minister for whom Denton (and Denton County) in Texas are named
- Matt Dillahunty (born 1969), atheist philosopher, media host
- James T. Draper Jr. (born 1935), Baptist
- Claude Marie Dubuis (1817–1895), Catholic bishop
- Michael Duca (born 1952), Roman Catholic bishop
- Yusuf Estes (born 1944), Islamic scholar (moved to Texas from Ohio)
- Kevin Farrell (born 1947), Roman Catholic bishop
- Daniel E. Flores (born 1961), Catholic bishop
- Patrick Flores (1929–2017), Catholic archbishop
- George Foreman (1949–2025), Christian ordained minister, world heavyweight champion boxer, entrepreneur
- Charles Victor Grahmann (1931–2018), Catholic bishop
- Ruben Habito (born 1947), Zen master, former Jesuit priest
- John Hagee (born 1940), nondenominational
- Kenneth E. Hagin (1917–2003), Pentecostal
- Homer Hailey (1903–2000), Church of Christ
- J. H. Hamblen (1877–1971), Methodist bishop
- John Wesley Hardt (1921–2017), Methodist
- Samuel Augustus Hayden (1839–1918), Baptist pastor, newspaper publisher
- Steve Hill (1954–2014), evangelist
- Victor Houteff (1885–1955), founder of Davidian Seventh-day Adventist organization
- V. E. Howard (1911–2000), Church of Christ; started radio International Gospel Hour in Texarkana
- Jack Hyles (1926–2001), Baptist
- T. D. Jakes (born 1957), nondenominational pastor, entrepreneur, author
- Robert Jeffress (born 1955), pastor since 2007 of the First Baptist Church of Dallas
- James S. Johnston (1843–1924), Episcopal bishop, educator
- Jerry Johnston (born 1959), Baptist
- Jimmy Kessler (1945–2022), Jewish
- John Kilian (1811–1884), Lutheran
- Abraham Cohen Labatt (1802–1899), Jewish
- Umphrey Lee (1893–1958), Methodist pastor, president of Southern Methodist University
- David Lefkowitz (1875–1955), Jewish
- G. Craige Lewis (born 1969), Presbyterian
- Max Lucado (born 1955), Church of Christ
- Texe Marrs (1944–2019), ran Christian ministries, writer on religious themes
- J. Vernon McGee (1904–1988), Presbyterian
- Charles R. Moore (1934–2014), Methodist minister, social activist, self-immolated

N–Z

- Bonnie Nettles (1927–1985), co-founded a religious group that would later become the Heaven's Gate cult
- J. Frank Norris (1877–1952), Baptist
- Grady Nutt (1934–1982), Baptist minister, humorist
- Jean-Marie Odin (1800–1870), Catholic bishop
- Levi Olan (1903–1984), Jewish
- Joel Osteen (born 1963), nondenominational
- John Osteen (1925–1999), nondenominational
- Albert Outler (1908–1989), Methodist theologian
- Daniel Parker (1781–1844), Primitive Baptist, Two-Seed-in-the-Spirit Predestinarian Baptist
- Paige Patterson (born 1942), Baptist
- William Evander Penn (1832–1895), Baptist evangelist
- Doug Phillips (born 1965), Christian author, speaker, attorney, homeschooling advocate
- Paul Powell (1933–2016), Baptist minister, educator
- Aron Ra (born 1962), atheist activist, politician
- John R. Rice (1895–1980), Baptist
- James Robison (1943–2026), nondenominational
- Benjamin Roden (1902–1978), prime organizer of Branch Davidian Seventh-day Adventist Association
- Lois Roden (1916–1986), president of Branch Davidian Seventh-day Adventist Church
- Lester Roloff (1914–1982), Independent Baptist
- Dmitri Royster (1923–2011), archbishop of Orthodox Church in America
- Hyman Judah Schachtel (1907–1990), Jewish
- R. W. Schambach (1926–2012), Christian televangelist based in Tyler
- Priscilla Shirer (born 1974), Christian speaker, author
- William Angie Smith (1894–1974), Methodist bishop
- Joseph P. Sneed (1804–1881), Methodist Episcopal minister, educator, great-great-great-grandfather of Carly Fiorina
- Samuel M. Stahl (born 1939), Jewish
- David E. Stern (born 1961), Jewish
- Chuck Swindoll (born 1934), Evangelical
- James Anthony Tamayo (born 1949), Roman Catholic
- Robert Tilton (born 1946), Christian televangelist
- George Washington Truett (1867–1944), Baptist
- Cecil Williams (1929–2024), Methodist minister, community leader, author, lecturer, spokesperson for the poor
- Kenneth W. Wright (born 1945), Church of Christ
- John Yanta (1931–2022), Roman Catholic bishop
- Jack Yates (1828–1897), Baptist pastor, black community leader, former slave

== Supercentenarians (longevity) ==
- Isaac Brock (c. 1800?–1909), supercentenarian
- Arbella Ewing (1894–2008), at her death was the third oldest person in the world
- Elizabeth Francis (1909–2024), at her death was the oldest person in the United States and the third oldest person in the world
- Thomas Nelson Sr. (1895–2007), at his death was the oldest man in the United States and the second oldest man in the world
- Richard Arvin Overton (1906–2018), at his death was the oldest man in the United States
- Margaret Skeete (1878–1994), oldest person ever from Texas

== Infamous Texans ==
A–M

- Charles Albright (1933–2020), Dallas area serial killer
- Marshall Applewhite (1931–1997), organized Heaven's Gate cult and led its members in a mass suicide
- Joe Ball (1892–1938), serial killer
- Buck Barrow (1903–1933), member of Bonnie and Clyde's gang, brother of Clyde Barrow
- Sam Bass (1851–1878), train robber and western icon
- John Battaglia (1955–2018), murdered his two young daughters
- Celeste Beard (born 1963), convicted murderer
- Benny Binion (1904–1989), crime boss; later a Las Vegas casino owner
- Bonnie and Clyde (Bonnie Parker [1910–1934] and Clyde Barrow [1909–1934]), bank robbers and murderers
- Rebecca Bradley (c. 1905 – 1950), the Flapper Bandit
- David Owen Brooks (1955–2020), Houston serial killer, early 1970s
- Barrett Brown (born 1981), journalist, essayist, satirist, activist; served time in federal prison for facilitating email leaks
- Marilyn Buck (1947–2010), accomplice in both the 1979 prison break of black activist Assata Shakur and the 1981 Brink's robbery
- Laura Bullion (1876–1961), member of Butch Cassidy's gang
- Kirbyjon Caldwell (born 1953), pastor convicted of fraud
- William Carver (1868–1901), member of Butch Cassidy's gang
- Rex Cauble (1913–2003), millionaire businessman convicted for drug-smuggling activities, which he denied
- Jamiel Chagra (1944–2008), drug trafficker
- Mark David Chapman (born 1955), murdered former Beatle John Lennon
- Billy Chemirmir (1972–2023), serial killer
- Joseph Civello (1902–1970), Dallas crime boss
- Dean Corll (1939–1973), serial killer
- Ethan Couch (born 1997), following a conviction for multiple counts of intoxication manslaughter was given probation based on affluenza defense
- James Richard Curry (1946–1983), serial killer, rapist
- J. Frank Dalton (1848–1951), claimed to be the outlaw Jesse James
- T. Cullen Davis (1933–2026), heir to oil fortune, arrested for murder and solicitation; acquitted of criminal charges but held responsible in wrongful death lawsuit
- William George Davis (born 1984), serial killer
- Lottie Deno (Carlotta Thompkins) (1844–1934), gambler
- Christopher Duntsch (born 1971), neurosurgeon imprisoned for gross malpractice
- Jane Elkins (c. 1800 – 1853), slave convicted of murder, first woman legally executed in Texas
- Russell Erxleben (born 1957), former NFL kicker, convicted of securities fraud
- Billie Sol Estes (1925–2013), businessman convicted of fraud
- King Fisher (1853–1884), gunslinger, outlaw
- Ralph Fults (1911–1993), outlaw, associated with Bonnie and Clyde
- James Grigson (1932–2004), forensic psychiatrist, expelled by APA for unethical conduct
- Raymond Hamilton (1913–1935), member of Bonnie and Clyde's gang; executed
- John Wesley Hardin (1853–1895), outlaw and gun-fighter, reputed to be "the meanest man alive"
- Charles Harrelson (1938–2007), hitman
- Elmer Wayne Henley (born 1956), Houston serial killer, early 1970s
- John Hinckley Jr. (born 1955), attempted to assassinate President Reagan
- Arnoldo Jimenez (born 1982), uxoricide and FBI most wanted fugitive
- Micah Xavier Johnson (c. 1991–2016), ambushed and killed multiple Dallas police officers
- Genene Jones (born 1950), pediatric nurse who killed multiple patients
- W. D. Jones (1916–1974), member of Bonnie and Clyde's gang
- Ben Kilpatrick (1874–1912), member of Butch Cassidy's gang
- David Koresh (1959–1993), self-proclaimed messiah and head of Branch Davidian cult
- Colleen LaRose (born 1963), "Jihad Jane", charged with multiple terrorist-related crimes
- Rosario (1887–1954) and Sam (1894–1951) Maceo, brothers, organized-crime bosses in Galveston
- R. D. Matthews (1920–2013), Dallas crime figure
- Robert Jay Mathews (1953–1984), neo-Nazi white supremacist
- Linda Medlar (born 1949), involved in sex scandal with politician Henry Cisneros; later convicted for bank fraud
- Della Moore (c. 1880 – c. 1926), prostitute, girlfriend of outlaw Harvey Logan ("Kid Curry")

N–Z

- Johnny Jack Nounes (1890–1970), organized-crime boss in Galveston
- Ronald Clark O'Bryan (1944–1984), murdered his son with poisoned Halloween candy; executed
- Tom O'Folliard (1858–1880), outlaw and Billy the Kid's best friend
- Lee Harvey Oswald (1939–1963), assassin of U.S. President John F. Kennedy
- Christine Paolilla (born 1986), murdered four people
- Kenneth Parnell (1931–2008), sex offender, kidnapper of seven-year-old Steven Stayner
- Albert T. Patrick (1866–1940), lawyer convicted of the murder of businessman and philanthropist William Marsh Rice, his client
- Etta Place (c. 1878–19??), companion of outlaw Harry Longabaugh, the "Sundance Kid"
- Jonathan Pollard (born 1954), intelligence analyst convicted of espionage
- Fannie Porter (1873 – c. 1940), prostitute, madam, associated with several outlaws
- Ollie Quinn (1893–1949), mobster, gang leader in Galveston
- Richard Ramirez (1960–2013), serial killer
- Paul Dennis Reid (1957–2013), serial killer
- Ollie P. Roberts (c. 1879–1950), claimed to be Billy the Kid
- Charles Rogers (1921–1975), murder suspect, disappeared mysteriously, declared dead in absentia
- "Freeway" Rick Ross (born 1960), convicted drug trafficker
- J. L. Hunter "Red" Rountree (1911–2004), bank robber
- Darlie Routier (born 1970), convicted of murdering young son; verdict has been challenged
- Jack Ruby (1910–1967), killed Lee Harvey Oswald following the assassination of President John F. Kennedy
- Yaser Abdel Said (born 1957), murdered his two daughters
- Yolanda Saldívar (born 1960), convicted for the murder of pop singer Selena
- Mark Salling (1982–2018), actor, convicted on charges of possession of child pornography
- Jon Schillaci (born 1971), former FBI Ten Most Wanted Fugitive
- Dena Schlosser (born 1969), murdered her 11-month-old daughter
- Bobby Seale (born 1936), co-founder of the Black Panthers
- Servant Girl Annihilator (fl. 1885), unidentified serial killer from Austin
- Henry Smith (1876–1893), murdered a child; he was lynched
- Soapy Smith (1860–1898), infamous confidence man of Round Rock and Fort Worth
- Richard B. Spencer (born 1978), white supremacist
- Allen Stanford (born 1950), financier convicted of operating a Ponzi scheme and fraud
- Belle Starr (1848–1889), the Wild West's "bandit queen"
- D. C. Stephenson (1891–1966), murderer, rapist, Grand Dragon of the Indiana Ku Klux Klan
- Peggy Jo Tallas (1944–2005), bank robber
- Texas Seven, group of prison escapees who caused a national manhunt after a crime spree in December 2000, apprehended in January 2001 due to America's Most Wanted
- Libby Thompson (1855–1953), dancehall girl, prostitute, and brothel owner better known as Squirrel-tooth Alice
- Bernie Tiede (born 1958), convicted murderer, subject of the 2011 film Bernie
- Catalina Vasquez Villalpando (born 1940), Treasurer of the United States, convicted of tax evasion and obstruction of justice
- Edgar Valdez Villarreal (born 1973), "La Barbie", drug trafficker
- Dutch Voight (1888–1986), gang leader in Galveston
- Malcolm Wallace (1921–1971), murderer; alleged with involvement in JFK assassination
- Tex Watson (born 1945), convicted murderer, former member of the Charles Manson "Family"
- Cameron Todd Willingham (1968–2004), convicted and executed for the murder of his children; verdict has been challenged
- Susan Wright (born 1976), convicted murderer
- Andrea Yates (born 1964), drowned her five children in the bathtub of her house
- Diane Zamora (born 1978), convicted, along with her boyfriend, David Graham, in notorious "cadet murder" case

== Others ==
=== A–M ===
- Paul Alexander (1946–2024), paralytic polio survivor, attorney and author who spent 72 years in an iron lung
- Javier Ambler (1979–2019), killed by law-enforcement officers during an arrest
- Gordon Arnold (1941–1997), witness to the assassination of John F. Kennedy
- Bobo Barnett (1903–1985), circus clown
- Carole Baskin (born 1961), animal rights activist, featured on the Netflix series Tiger King
- Lee Bowers (1925–1966), witness to the assassination of John F. Kennedy
- Joe Bowman (1925–2009), bootmaker and marksman and guardian of Old West culture
- Clarence Brandley (1951–2018), exonerated after serving nine years on death row for a murder and rape he did not commit
- Ben Breedlove (1993–2011), Internet personality
- Allen Brooks (1840s?–1910), victim of a Dallas lynch mob
- Frank Buck (1884–1950), hunter, animal collector, author (Bring 'Em Back Alive), actor, director, producer
- Buffalo Hump (c. 1800 – c. 1867), Comanche chief
- Busby quintuplets (born 2015), set of quintuplets
- Barbara Bush (born 1981), healthcare activist
- Chukwu octuplets: Ebuka, Chidi, Echerem, Chima, Ikem, Jioke, Gorom (all born 1998), and Odera (1998–1998), first recorded live-born set of octuplets in U.S.
- Leslie Cochran (1951–2012), peace activist, cross-dresser, urban outdoorsman
- Carol Cole (1963–1980), murder victim whose body was unidentified for 34 years
- Crazy Ray (Wilford Jones) (1931–2007), Dallas Cowboys mascot
- Mark Crutcher (1948–2023), anti-abortion activist, author, and founder of Life Dynamics Inc.
- George de Mohrenschildt (1911–1977), petroleum geologist, friend of Lee Harvey Oswald, gave testimony to the Warren Commission
- Billie Ert (c. 1942–1976), member of first same-sex couple to be married in Texas
- James Farmer (1920–1999), civil rights activist
- Joseph Gottschalk (1950–2003), gained international notoriety for riding a bicycle throughout San Antonio clad only in a thong
- Lauren Grandcolas (1963–2001), one of the passengers on United Airlines Flight 93 during the September 11 attacks
- Anthony Charles Graves (born 1965), exonerated after serving 18 years in prison, including 12 on death row, for a series of murders he did not commit
- Amber Hagerman (1986–1996), victim of abduction/murder, namesake of Amber alert
- Lawrence Herkimer (1925–2015), cheerleading innovator
- Jean Hill (1931–2000), witness to the assassination of John F. Kennedy
- Joan Robinson Hill (1931–1969), socialite, equestrian, murder victim; events surrounding her death were the subject of a book by Thomas Thompson and a film, Murder in Texas
- Bose Ikard (1840s?–1929), cowboy, cattle driver, former slave
- Brandon Lawson (1987 – disappeared 2013), disappeared mysteriously
- Ben H. Love (1930–2010), Scouting executive
- Stacie Madison (1970 – disappeared 1988), disappeared mysteriously
- John McClamrock (1956–2008), whose life as a quadraplegic following a football injury was profiled by journalist Skip Hollandsworth in an award-winning story
- Jessica McClure (born 1986), "Baby Jessica", rescued after falling into a well
- Norma McCorvey (1947–2017), as "Jane Roe", was the plaintiff in the 1973 landmark U.S. Supreme Court case Roe v. Wade
- Ahmed Mohamed (born 2001), arrested at MacArthur High School in Irving, for bringing a reassembled clock to school, which a teacher thought looked like a bomb; police determined that Mohamed had no malicious intent
- Antonio Molina (c. 1939–1991), member of first same-sex couple to be married in Texas
- Mary Moorman (born 1932), witness to the assassination of John F. Kennedy
- Michael Morton (born 1954), exonerated after serving 25 years in prison for a murder he did not commit
- Julie Ann Moseley (1965 – disappeared 1974), disappeared mysteriously
- Khalid Abdul Muhammad (1948–2001), black American activist
- Mukwooru (1770s–1840), Comanche chief

=== N–Z ===
- Orville Nix (1911–1972), filmed assassination of John F. Kennedy
- Donna Norris (born 1967), child safety campaigner, mother of Amber Hagerman
- Michael Paine (1928–2018), acquaintance of Lee Harvey Oswald
- Ruth Paine (1932–2025), friend of Marina Oswald
- Lucy Parsons (c. 1853–1942), labor organizer, radical socialist, anarchist communist, orator
- Steven Pruitt (born 1984), Wikipedia editor
- Olga Rodriguez (born c. 1947), Chicano activist, has represented U.S. Socialist Workers Party
- Santos Rodriguez (1960–1973), 12-year-old murdered by a law-enforcement officer while in police custody
- Andrew Sansom (born 1945), conservationist
- Charlotte Mailliard Shultz (1933–2021), chief of protocol of State of California and City and County of San Francisco, trustee of San Francisco War Memorial and Performing Arts Center, widow of former Secretary of State George P. Shultz
- Karen Silkwood (1948–1974), nuclear plant worker, labor activist, died under mysterious circumstances; subject of a major motion picture
- Marilyn Sitzman (1939–1993), witness to the assassination of John F. Kennedy
- Susan Smalley (1969 – disappeared 1988), disappeared mysteriously
- Swante M. Swenson (1816–1896), founder of SMS ranches
- James Tague (1936–2014), witness to the assassination of John F. Kennedy who sustained minor injuries during the shooting
- Bob Tallman (born 1947), rodeo announcer
- J. L. Tarr (1919–2008), scouting executive
- Doris Tate (1924–1992), advocate for crime victims' rights, mother of Sharon Tate
- Emma Tenayuca (1916–1999), labor leader, union organizer
- Martin Luther Thompson, Texas Choctaw leader
- William Clyde Thompson (c. 1839–1912), Texas Choctaw leader
- Michael Roy Toney (1965–2009), served ten years on death row after being wrongly convicted for a deadly bombing
- Armando Torres III (1987 – disappeared 2013), kidnapped in Mexico
- Rachel Trlica (1957 – disappeared 1974), disappeared mysteriously
- Willie Velasquez (1944–1988), social activist
- Richard Viguerie (born 1933), conservative figure, pioneer of political direct mail and writer on American politics
- James Larkin "Jim" White (1882–1946), cave explorer, cowboy, miner, park ranger, discovered Carlsbad Caverns
- Dallas Wiens (1985–2024), first U.S. recipient of a full face transplant
- Roy Williams (born 1944), Scouting executive
- Kelly Dae Wilson (1974 – disappeared 1992), disappeared mysteriously
- Renee Wilson (1960 – disappeared 1974), disappeared mysteriously
- Plennie L. Wingo (1895–1993), world record for longest distance walked backwards (from Santa Monica, California, to Istanbul, Turkey)
- Ron Woodroof (1950–1992), HIV/AIDS victim who created the Dallas Buyers Club to acquire and distribute AIDS drugs; subject of a major motion picture
- Quanell X (born 1970), leader of New Black Panther Party in Houston
- Yellow Wolf (c. 1800–1854), Comanche chief
- Abraham Zapruder (1905–1970), clothing manufacturer, filmed assassination of John F. Kennedy in Dallas in 1963

== See also ==
- List of Texas A&M University people
- List of Texas blues musicians
- List of Texas suffragists
- List of Texas Tech University alumni
- Category:Lists of people from Texas
