= Timeline of jazz education =

Timeline of jazz education (a chronology of jazz pedagogy): The initial jazz education movement in North American was much an outgrowth of the music education movement that had been in full swing since the 1920s. Chuck Suber (né Charles Harry Suber; 1921–2015), former editor of Down Beat, averred that the GI Bill following World War II was a key impetus for the jazz education movement in higher education. During the WWII, the U.S. Armed Forces had been the nation's largest employer of musicians – including women musicians. (Note: During World War II, approximately 500 bands served the U.S. Army. The bands were categorized into three types: special bands, separate bands, and organization bands. The Army and Navy had their own schools of music.) After the War, many of those musicians sought to pursue music as a career, and, with assistance of the GI Bill, found colleges offering curricular jazz. Suber also pointed out that the rise of stage bands in schools was directly proportionate to the decline of big name bands. (Note: "Stage Bands Growing Trend," by Michael K. Burns, Decatur Daily Review, January 12, 1964, p. 3 Charles ("Chuck") H. Suber, publisher of Down Beat between 1952 and 1982 (less 6 years in the 1960s), and exponent of stage bands in music education as a pathway for jazz, reflects on the jazz education movement) (retrieved September 28, 2017, via newspapers.com at www.newspapers.com/image/90975607/))

== Non-academic (non-curricular) ==
=== Social services for children ===
c. 1891:	Jenkins Orphanage of Charleston, was founded by Rev. Daniel Joseph Jenkins (1882–1937) in 1891. He formed bands to raise money for the orphanage. Its alumni include William "Cat" Anderson, Jabbo Smith, Tom Delaney, and Freddie Green. Francis Eugene Mikell (1885–1932), a trumpeter, was one of its notable teachers. Rev. Jenkins' son, Edmund Jenkins (1894–1926), a composer, influenced the introduction of jazz at the orphanage.
1890s:	Alpha Cottage School, an orphanage in Kingston, Jamaica, offered a music program.
n.d.	Jane Addams's Hull House, Chicago (see Benny Goodman).
n.d.	Colored Waifs' Home, New Orleans, where Louis Armstrong received his first formal music training after a court sent him there for firing a pistol in the air on New Year's Eve 1912.

=== Scholastic, clinics, camps ===
1916:
Major N. Clark Smith taught at Lincoln High School, Kansas City. From 1922 he taught at Wendell Phillips High School in Chicago.
1917:
A Victor record (Vic catalog no. 18255), "Livery Stable Blues" (side A; matrix/take 19331-1) and "Dixieland Jass Band One-Step" (side B; matrix/take 19332-3), recorded February 16, 1917 (one hundred and nine years ago), at Victor's studio in Manhattan at 46 West 38th Street, 12th floor (top floor) by the Original Dixieland Jass Band is widely acknowledged as the first commercially released jazz recording.
1917:
Industrial High School in Birmingham, Alabama. John Tuggle "Fess" Whatley (né John Lewis Whatley; 1896–1972) offered extracurricular marching and concert bands, and the Jazz Demons in 1922.
1927:
Jimmie Lunceford organized a jazz band at Manassa High School, Memphis, known as the Chickasaw Syncopators. Manassa included jazz as part of music curriculum. Two years later, in 1929, Lunceford and a few of his former classmates from Fisk University – including Eddie Wilcox, Willie Smith and Henry Wells – formed a band and turned professional.
1931:
Capt. Walter Dyett produced many well-known jazz musicians at Wendell Phillips High School and from 1935 at DuSable High School. Alumni include Gene Ammons, Johnny Griffin, Eddie Harris, Richard Davis, and Nat "King" Cole. The curriculum taught was almost exclusively classical.
1957:
Lenox School of Jazz: Summer jazz school in Massachusetts founded.
1959:
National Stage Band Camps, Inc., founded by Kenneth Morris in 1957 in Rochester, Indiana, as the National Dance Band Camp, Inc., collaborated beginning in 1959 with Stan Kenton to host Summer Jazz Clinics. They were later renamed the Stan Kenton Summer Clinics. These camps featured the full Stan Kenton Orchestra, plus other well known jazz educators on the faculty. It continued until Stan's passing in 1979.
1964:
Jazzmobile, Inc., was co-founded in 1964 by (i) Daphne Arnstein (née Vera Daphne Barritt Vane; 1911–1990), an arts patron and founder of the Harlem Cultural Council, and (ii) Dr. William "Billy" Taylor.
1967:
Stan Kenton participated at the Tanglewood Education Symposium for the first time and addresses the validity and perpetuation of American jazz education programs in school band programs.

Jamey Aebersold publishes his first play-a-long recording and book set, selling it through an ad in Down Beat magazine. The book aims to support jazz learning and practicing at home in a music-minus-one format.

=== Non-curricular collegiate ===
1919:
The earliest sanctioned collegiate jazz ensembles were extracurricular, such as the Tuskegee Institute's Syncopated Band, initiated in 1919 by the renowned educator and bandleader Len Bowden (né Leonard Lee Bowden; 1899–1989).
1924:
Under the direction of Volney Cyrus Barcus (1903–1990), then a student, (Note: Obituary: "V. Cyrus Barcus," Park Cities People, February 22, 1990, p. 9) the Southern Methodist University Band introduced dixieland jazz on its own football field, Ownby Oval, in University Park, on September 27, 1924, during a game against North Texas State Teachers College. (Note: "SMU Band Living up to Standard," Dallas Morning News, November 6, 1975, Sect. B, p. 17)
1930s:
The Bama State Collegians, a student jazz orchestra was founded in the 1930s at Alabama State University and was organized by Len Bowden (né Leonard Lee Bowden; 1899–1989) and John Tuggle "Fess" Whatley (né John Lewis Whatley; 1896–1972). They were directed by Tommy Stewart and Erskine Hawkins.

The Auburn Knights Orchestra, a student jazz orchestra was founded in September 1930 on the campus of Alabama Polytechnic Institute (later Auburn University).

c. 1940:
Prairie View Co-eds flourished as a popular all-female band.

== Academic (curricular) ==
=== Primary and secondary education in North America ===
1936:	Samuel Rodney Browne (1908–1991), a proficient classical pianist, who was African American, broke a race barrier at Jefferson High School, Los Angeles, when the school hired him in 1936 to teach music. In short order, he persuaded the L.A. High School District to establish a jazz band curriculum. Browne, in 1929, had graduated summa cum laude from USC.
1939:	Glenn Earl Brown (1914–1965) had been, for more than 14 years, a marimba soloist with the Xavier Cugat Orchestra. (Note: (title needed), Portsmouth Herald (Portsmouth, New Hampshire), col. 1, p. 8, Aug. 8, 1964) He was the father of Raymond Harry Brown (jazz trumpeter and educator) and Stephen Charles Brown (jazz guitarist and educator).

=== Higher education outside of North America ===
1928:	Bernhard Sekles, at the Hoch Conservatory in Frankfurt am Main, Germany, launched the first curricular jazz program in the world. He did it under heavy criticism from throughout Germany. The courses were headed by Mátyás Seiber. A recording of the jazz band from 1931 can be heard on German Radio archives. Both Sekles and Seiber were Jewish and the Nazis stopped the program in 1933. The program was restarted in 1976 under the direction of Albert Mangelsdorff.
1964:	The Academy for Music and the Performing Arts in Graz, founded in 1963 by Erich Marckhl (de) (1902–1980), established its Jazz Department in 1964 and formed its Jazz Research Centre in 1969.
1965:	Leeds College of Music offered one of the first jazz courses in Europe.
1969:	Northern Illinois University (NIU) Jazz Studies Program was founded in 1969 by Ron Modell who, tasked with creating a jazz program from scratch, held auditions for the initial jazz ensemble, with 60 hopeful musicians vying for 20 seats.
1974:	Banff School of Fine Arts: Oscar Peterson and Phil Nimmons set up the Jazz Workshop.
1974:	Jazz music departments in the music colleges of the USSR began in 1974, the first being at the Gnessin State Musical College. Professor Igor Bril (de) (born 1944) and Oseychuk Alexander are credited as being pioneers of jazz education in Russia.
1982:	American School of Modern Music of Paris: Jazz courses started by Stephen Carbonara.
1983:	The Sibelius Academy in Helsinki Finland. Jazz courses started by Kaj Backlund. Bachelor and Masters program. In 1986 Jukkis Uotila, took over as the head of the department and revised the curriculum totally. Later in the 1990s doctoral studies led by professor drummer, pianist and composer Jukkis Uotila, a pioneer of jazz education in Finland.
1986:	Darius Brubeck established the first jazz program in Africa at University of KwaZulu-Natal in Durban, South Africa. Notable alumni include the late trumpeter and jazz educator, John Mekoa (de)
1998:	Denny Euprasert (th) (born 1969) established first jazz program at Mahidol University in Thailand.
2011:	Tom Smith established the first university jazz program in Mainland China at Ningbo University.

=== Higher education in North America ===
1932:	Percy Grainger, who had studied music at the Hoch Conservatory from 1895 to 1900, became Dean of Music at New York University. Grainger extended his reputation as an experimenter by putting jazz on the syllabus and hosting Duke Ellington, with his band, on October 25, 1932, as a guest lecturer. Wilfred Bain, who had earned a Master of Arts in Music Education in 1936 from NYU and had studied with Percy Grainger, went on to become Dean at North Texas from 1938 to 1947 and Dean at Indiana University Bloomington School of Music from 1947 to 1973.
1941:	New School of Social Research in New York offered a course in jazz history, which distinguished the school as the first institution of higher learning in North America to offer, for academic credit, a jazz history course. The course – taught by Leonard Feather, Robert Goffin, and Marshall Stearns – examined jazz from a scholarly perspective.
1945:	Lawrence Berk founded the Schillinger House of Music in Boston. Berk changed the name to Berklee School of Music in 1954. The school granted its first bachelor's degrees in 1966. Berklee, which received its initial accreditation in 1973 by the Commission on Institutions of Higher Education of the New England Association of Schools and Colleges, and has been accredited since. In 1973 Berklee's name was changed to Berklee College of Music.
1945:	Westlake College of Music, Hollywood, California – founded in 1945 by Alvin Leroy Learned (1916–1994), but closed in 1961 – became the first academic institution in the country to offer a college diploma (two- and four-year degrees) that included a curriculum in jazz.
1946:	George Avakian, at the New York University, launched one of the first jazz history courses.
1940s:	Alabama State University, Tennessee State University, Wilberforce University, North Texas, Berklee, Los Angeles City College, and Westlake College of Music were among the first to offer college credit for jazz ensembles, improvisation, and arranging.
1947:	The University of North Texas became the first university in the world to offer a degree in Jazz Studies: Major in "Dance Band" or dance music degree. North Texas, for 20 years, from 1947 to 1967, was the only institution that offered jazz oriented degrees. (Note: Philip Allen Scott, in his 1973 book, Jazz Educated, Man (cited below), stated that, until 1967, North Texas was the only college that offered a jazz oriented degree. Jaap Gerritse, in 1987, however, stated that in the 1950s, 5 colleges offered a jazz oriented degree. (Gerritse 1987) Michael Spencer, PhD, identified five academic U.S. institutions offering jazz oriented degrees: (i) the Schillinger House (beginning 1945), (ii) Westlake College of Music in (beginning 1945), (iii) Los Angeles City College (beginning 1946), (iv) California Polytechnic State University (beginning 1948), and (v) North Texas (beginning 1947). (Spencer, Journal of Historical Research in Music Education, October 2013) However, Berklee School of Music (Schillinger House) did not award a Bachelor of Music degree until 1966; Los Angeles City College offered only Associate's Degrees; and Westlake closed in 1961.) Gene Hall led the inaugural program at the invitation of the presiding dean, Walter Hutchinson Hodgson (1904–1988), who approved it during his first year as dean. Hodgson was the successor to Wilfren Bain, who, in 1947, accepted an appointment as Dean of the Indiana University School of Music. Hall had written his master's thesis on the topic in 1944.
1950s:	By 1950, 15 colleges and universities offered curricular jazz courses; During the 1950s, the number of colleges and universities offering curricular jazz increased to 30.
1952:	The Institute of Jazz Studies was founded by Marshall Stearns. It is the largest and most comprehensive library and archive of jazz and jazz-related materials in the world.
1959:	Notre Dame Collegiate Jazz Festival became the first collegiate jazz festival in the Midwestern United States.
1968:	Hank Levy was hired in 1968 to take over jazz studies at Towson University. Levy rapidly built the program to a level of international rank.
Mr. Levy, we don't wish to be known as a jazz school. – Towson University administration
Too late. – Hank Levy (1970s) (Note: "'Whiplash' legacy: Towson University to Posthumously Honor Jazz Pioneer Hank Levy," by Mathew Klickstein, Baltimore Sun, April 7, 2017 (headline is in reference to the 2014 film Whiplash))
1972:	Only 15 U.S. institutions of higher learning were offering a degree in jazz studies Acceptance of jazz oriented degrees began to flourish in the 1970s for a number of reasons, namely because many people who had become jazz fans as youths had risen to positions of authority in higher education. Also, it became difficult to ignore the successes that some institutions had produced.
1975:	University of North Texas One O'Clock Lab Band, under direction of Leon Breeden, became first collegiate ensemble to receive a Grammy nomination. (Note: "The 1 O'Clock Lab Band Meets Granny, Grammy," Dallas Morning News, January 10, 1978)
1981:	McGill University (Schulich School of Music) became the first university in Canada to offer a Bachelor of Music degree in Jazz Performance.
1982:	Seventy-two colleges and universities were offering degrees in jazz studies
1986:	The New School for Jazz and Contemporary Music was launched in 1986 by David Levy, Arnie Lawrence (1938–2005), and Paul Weinstein. Roy Hargrove is among the school's alumni.
1989:	Over one hundred colleges and universities were offering degrees in jazz studies.
2009:	University of North Texas One O'Clock Lab Band, under direction of Steve Wiest, received its sixth Grammy nomination.
2014:	Berklee became the first nonprofit institution to offer fully online accredited bachelor's degree programs – 120 credits (the minimum required for a bachelor's degree, cost less than one year on campus).

=== Major music conservatories of North America ===
- (not affiliated with a university) (Note: Major music conservatories of North America (not affiliated with a university) – Some conservatories, schools of music, and colleges of music in North America are constituents of universities. Examples include the Eastman School of Music, a constituent of the University of Rochester, and Ithaca College School of Music, a constituent of Ithaca College. Definitions of "major music conservatories of North America" – as stand-alone institutions – vary. Nonetheless, this section does not include constituents of other institutions.)

1969:	The New England Conservatory, 102 years since its founding, became the first music conservatory, of a traditional European classical style, to offer an accredited jazz studies program. The program was founded by jazz historian, composer, musician, and, at that time, conservatory president, Gunther Schuller.
1982:	The Manhattan School of Music, a classical music institution since its founding in 1917, launched a jazz department in 1982 – one of the first in New York City. In 1984, the school established its Master of Music degree program in Jazz and Commercial Music Studies. In 1987, the school established a Bachelor of Music degree in Jazz and Commercial Music Studies. Like Juilliard, the Manhattan School of Music had enrolled many successful jazz musicians – including Max Roach, John Lewis, Dick Katz, Ron Carter, Joe Wilder, Hugh Masekela, and Donald Byrd, all of whom studied classical music at the school. Despite being located in a city known for jazz, the school waited 65 years before formally adding jazz to its curriculum.
2001:	The Juilliard School, in September 2001, launched a postcollege, nondegree program for about 20 instrumentalists to focus on jazz orchestra and small ensemble performance for one or two years, paying no tuition. In September 2004, 99 years since its founding – Juilliard launched a jazz-based bachelor of music degree program for 12 to 15 first-time college students and transfer students. Victor Goines was the program's founding director. (Note: "Juilliard School to Introduce a Jazz Studies Program," Archived 2017-09-28 at the Wayback Machine by Ben Ratliff, New York Times, April 26, 2000)

== National associations ==
1968:	Music Educators National Conference (MENC) established the National Association of Jazz Educators (NAJE) at the 1968 Annual MENC Conference in Seattle. Based in Manhattan, Kansas, the organization was renamed the International Association for Jazz Education (IAJE) in 1989. It went bankrupt in 2008.
1989:	The International Association of Schools of Jazz (IASJ), founded in 1989 by Dave Liebman, hosted its first meeting in The Hague (The Netherlands).
2008:	The Jazz Education Network (JEN) was established in 2008. Its co-founders – Mary Jo Papich and Dr. Lou Fischer – structured the organization as a nonprofit with a mission, internationally, to advance jazz education, promote performance, and develop new audiences. As of 2017, the organization had members from over 23 countries, from every U.S. State, and 7 (of 10) Canadian provinces. JEN hosts annual conferences, provides scholarships, and sponsors other programs to help its mission.

== Selected jazz studies in higher education, North America ==
Jazz Studies bachelor's and master's degrees in the 1980s
Berklee:
The Berklee College of Music, in 1988, drew students from all over the world – roughly 20 percent were international, 40 percent were from New England and the Mid-Atlantic. Programs at Berklee stressed practical skills in areas that included film scoring, songwriting, and music production.
N Texas:
The University of North Texas College of Music had, in 1988, the second largest program in jazz, after Berklee.
Rutgers:
Rutgers University, since 1968, had been one of the few institutions offering Bachelor of Arts degrees in performance, with a jazz option. Notable teachers in the jazz programs, at the time, included Larry Ridley, Kenny Barron, Ted Dunbar, and master trumpet teacher William Fielder (1924–2009).
Indiana:
Indiana University hired David Baker (1931–2016) in 1967 with a mandate to design a degree-granting program in jazz studies. The university, during the 1968–1969 school-year, approved a baccalaureate in jazz studies, and in 1979, approved a master's degree program in jazz studies. Wilfred Bain, the presiding dean until 1973, was the also the presiding dean at North Texas, where, in 1942, he approved jazz arranging class to be taught by Gene Hall. Baker led a distinguished career as a pioneer in jazz education at the university level.
I remember a man who unfortunately is dead now, because he was a good man, but he was pretty staunch in his belief that – he told me that,

'As long as I'm here, jazz band will never be a major ensemble.'

Two weeks later, on a Thursday morning, it passed as a major ensemble.
– David Baker, Jacobs School of Music
Southern:
Southern University, Baton Rouge, Louisiana, formerly headed by free-jazz clarinetist and saxophonist Alvin Batiste, produced several prominent New Orleans jazz artists. Alvin Batiste is a cousin of the grandfather of Jon Batiste, bandleader of The Late Show with Stephen Colbert.
Howard:
Howard University had a strong reputation and, in the 1980s, offered a Bachelor of Music degree in Jazz Studies.
USC:
Thom David Mason, DMA (born 1941), founded the department of jazz studies at the USC Thornton School of Music in 1983 and was its chairman from 1983 to 1996. During that period he created the Bachelor of Music, Master of Music, and Doctor of Musical Arts programs in jazz studies. William Ennis Thomson, PhD, the presiding dean until 1992, is an alumnus of North Texas (1948; Bachelor of Music in Composition) where he had been a trumpeter in the inaugural Laboratory Dance Band (1946–1947) – the forerunner to the One O'Clock Lab Band.
Miami:
The University of Miami jazz program, in 1980, emphasized writing and arranging commercial music and, in the 1980s, offered a Bachelor of Music degree in Studio Music and Jazz. Commencing fall 1966, Miami hired Jerry Coker – who had been David Baker's classmate at Indiana – with a mandate to design and institute a degree-granting program in jazz studies. Bill Lee, PhD, Dean of the School of Music from 1964 to 1982, had been a student at North Texas from 1945 to 1950, earning Bachelor and Master of Music degrees at a time when its jazz studies program had been launched.
Wm Paterson:
William Paterson University, which started its jazz program around 1968, had Rufus Reid, who had been director of jazz performing groups for the music department, in 1981, became director of the department's jazz studies and performance program.
Eastman:
The Eastman School of Music has, since the 1940s, offered jazz studies. Back then, Jack End (1918–1986) directed its first official jazz band and also taught arranging. (Note: Jack End (1918–1986) became the first official director of Eastman's jazz band (in the 1940s). He had earned a Bachelor of Music degree in performance (clarinet) from Eastman in 1940.) Limited jazz classes were in the catelog when Chuck Magione became director of the jazz ensemble in 1968, whose studio orchestra (big band) was critically acclaimed. Despite having produced many jazz artists and jazz educators, Eastman did not offer a comprehensive jazz studies program until about 1974, when, under the leadership of Rayburn Wright, the Department of Jazz Studies and Contemporary Media emerged. By 1980s, Eastman was offering jazz oriented degrees through master's. Ray Wright is credited for having founded Eastman's graduate and undergraduate degree programs, as well as creating the Eastman Studio Orchestra.
NEC:
The New England Conservatory, under the leadership of its President, Gunther Schuller, founded its program in 1968 and rapidly became a leading institution for jazz studies. The conservatory, in the 1980s, offered jazz oriented degrees through master's. NEC is the first major traditional music conservatory to offer a degree in jazz.
MSM:
The Manhattan School of Music added a jazz department in 1982, followed by a jazz oriented master's in 1984, and a bachelor's in 1987. The school's influence in formalizing jazz education rapidly rose to prominence. Long before formalizing its jazz curriculum, the school had some of New York's top jazz artists on its faculty and as students.
Bridgeport:
The University of Bridgeport started its jazz studies program in 1971 under the direction of Neil Slater (born 1931), who ran it for 11 years. Slater then, from 1981 to 1982, was Chair of the Jazz Studies Department, and director of the One O'Clock Lab Band, at the North Texas.
Jazz Studies PhD programs in the 1980s

Few institutions offered doctorates in jazz in the 1980s. And few jazz educators held doctorates. Billy Taylor, who had over 23 honorary doctorates in his lifetime, had earned a PhD in 1975 from the University of Massachusetts. His dissertation was titled "The History and Development of Jazz Piano: A New Perspective for Educators." Donald Byrd earned an EdD from Teachers College, Columbia University in 1983, where he wrote "The Performance and Analysis of an Original Afro-American Musical Composition for Trumpet and Orchestra." Of the few jazz educators in the 1980s holding PhDs who were associated with jazz research, most had migrated from non-jazz fields such as general music theory, music history, musicology, and ethnomusicology. In the 1980s, only two institutions offered a PhD in jazz:
NYU:
The Department of Music and Performing Arts at the Steinhardt School, New York University, offered a PhD in Jazz Performance and Composition, but the degree, at the time, had no research requirement.
UNC:
The University of Northern Colorado in Greeley offered a PhD in Jazz Pedagogy, but, according to Lewis Porter who published an article in 1989 on the topic, the degree did not require scholarly research.

Porter, in 1989, stated that the field was in dire need of PhDs, and noted that, at the time, the existing programs did a poor job attracting African American scholars at PhD levels in jazz. Also in 1989, Warrick L. Carter (1942–2017), Chairman of the Department of Music at Governors State University, estimated that 15 or 20 schools offered postgraduate jazz programs leading to a master's degrees.

== Notes and references ==
=== Further reading ===
1. The New Grove Dictionary of Jazz, (subject: "Jazz Education") (in Vol. 2 of 3), Barry Dean Kernfeld, PhD (ed.), Oxford University Press (2001), pp. 396–397; OCLC 823865998
2. "Jazz Studies in American Schools and Colleges: a Brief History," by Daniel Murphy, Jazz Educators Journal, Vol. 26, 1994, pp. 34–38; ISSN 0730-9791
3. "Das Hoch'sche Konservatorium in Frankfurt am Main (1878–1978)" (thesis-dissertation), by Peter Cahn (de), Hoch Conservatory, Frankfurt: Kramer (de) (1979); OCLC 720383049
4. "Jazz Education in Britain," by Emma Hall (Leeds College of Music), originally published in Educational Courses in Britain (publish date not known, but before 2008); OCLC 498715147
  1. The article is a brochure for the Leeds College of Music
    1. Original link at www.intstudy.com/articles/ec185a14.htm, retrieved October 30, 2008, is dead – www.intstudy.com is a URL operated by BigChoice Group, Ltd., of London, founded 1999. The article was re-retrieved September 26, 2017, via Internet Archive at web.archive.org/web/20060322085120/http://www.intstudy.com/articles/ec185a14.htm
5. Jazz Education Guide – the Directory of Jazz Education, published annually as a supplement to JazzTimes; ISSN 1526-4661 1997/1998
  1998/1999
  1999/2001
  2001/2002
  2002/2003
  2003/2004
  2004/2005
  2005/2006
  2006/2007
  2009/2010
  2008/2009
  2015/2016
6. "Jazz Education in Canada Origins and Development," by David J. Elliott, PhD, Bulletin of Historical Research in Music Education, Vol. 6, No. 1, January 1985, pp. 17–27; OCLC 5912010928, 6883039172; ISSN 1536-6006; JSTOR 40214679)
