= International Association for Jazz Education =

Former corporation based in Manhattan, Kansas

International Association for Jazz Education (IAJE), formerly a not-for-profit corporation based in Manhattan, Kansas, was a volunteer-run organization that, among other things, allocated student scholarships through its approved festivals program. Its annual conference was a gathering point for professional artists as well as jazz enthusiasts. Many considered IAJE to be a foundation of the jazz community, and its many programs to be a cornerstone of jazz education.

IAJE was first incorporated as a non-profit on August 18, 1989, having developed from the International Association of Jazz Educators (since 1971) and the U.S. National Association of Jazz Education (since 1968). The association organized more than 7,000 teachers, musicians, producers, and others interested in jazz, from more than thirty countries. They organized a yearly conference, which included numerous musical presentations.

IAJE filed for bankruptcy April 2008, and ceased as a corporation March 15, 2009. The bankruptcy filing was necessitated, in part, because of financial problems stemming from a lack of donations, and losses – notably from the small turnout at the Toronto conference of 2008.

== IAJE Jazz Educators Hall of Fame ==
Each year the IAJE leadership selected recipients for the Jazz Education Hall of Fame from nominations received from the IAJE membership. The purpose of the Hall of Fame was to honor those individuals whose musical contributions and dedication to jazz education created new directions and curricular innovations for jazz education worldwide.

- 1978 Matt Betton
- 1979 Billy Taylor
- 1980 Stan Kenton
- 1981 Dr. Gene Hall
- 1982 David Baker
- 1983 John Roberts
- 1984 Clark Terry
- 1985 Leon Breeden
- 1986 Marian McPartland
- 1987 Lawrence Berk
- 1988 Lionel Hampton, Woody Herman, William Franklin Lee III
- 1989 Count Basie, Louis Bellson, Jamey Aebersold
- 1990 Louis Armstrong, Rich Matteson, Clem DeRosa
- 1991 Duke Ellington, Charlie Parker, Ray Wright
- 1992 Benny Carter, J. Richard Dunscomb, Dizzy Gillespie
- 1993 Maynard Ferguson, Max Roach, Herb Wong
- 1994 Jerry Coker, Willis Conover, Willie Thomas
- 1995 Gene Aitken, Doc Severinsen, Ella Fitzgerald
- 1996 Herb Pomeroy
- 1997 Dr. Warrick Carter
- 1998 Larry Ridley
- 1999 Robert Curnow, Bunky Green
- 2000 David Liebman
- 2001 Justin DiCioccio, Phil Nimmons
- 2002 Dave Brubeck
- 2003 Dan Haerle
- 2004 Sammy Nestico
- 2005 Bob Morgan
- 2006 Lee Eliot Berk
- 2007 Frank Mantooth

== IAJE Humanitarian Award ==
Celebrated Humanitarian Award recipients included drummer Ed Thigpen 2007 and producer George Avakian 2008.

== IAJE Jazz Ambassador Award ==
The final Jazz Ambassador Award was given to Tom Smith in 2008.

== Publications ==
- NAJE Newsletter; OCLC 1044764, 911680656, 679996639
- NAJE Educator – National Association of Jazz Educators News Letter

(forerunner to Jazz Educators Journal)
ISSN 0047-8741
OCLC 499210780, 858501289, 679996639, OCLC 639584817, 980836530, 1783884, OCLC 183428951

- Jazz Educators Journal

ISSN 0730-9791
OCLC 775814887
Jazz Educators Journal Index, 1969–1989, Vols. 1–21, Lee Bash, PhD (ed.)
OCLC 122297802, 225534256, 80259972, OCLC 50257980

- A Guide to N.A.J.E. Periodicals, Lee Bash (ed.), National Association of Jazz Educators (198?); OCLC 52253572

== See also ==
- International Jazz Festivals Organization (IJFO)
- Timeline of jazz education
