= Steve Wiest =

American musician (born 1957)

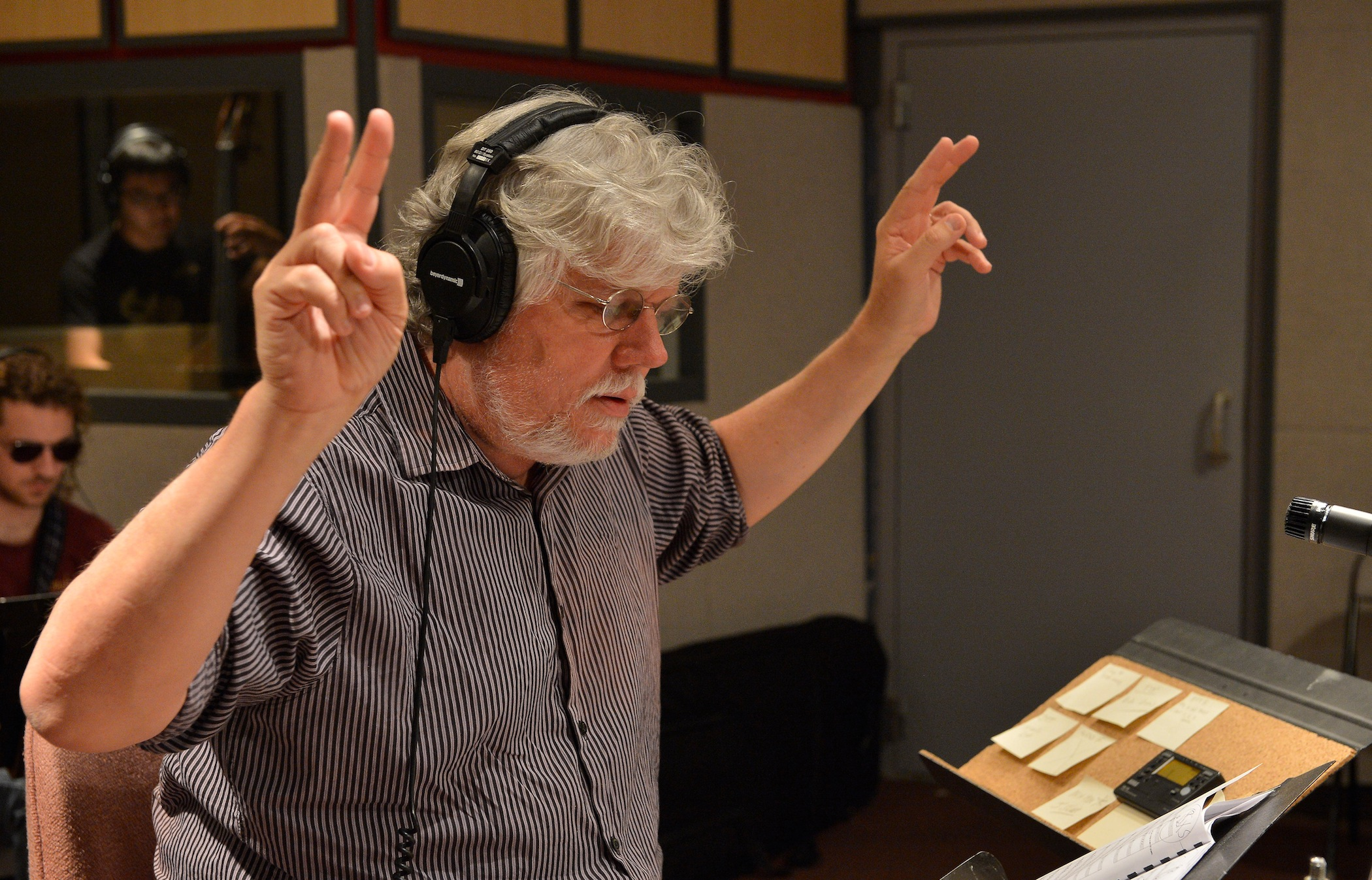
- From Lab 2013: Steve Wiest directing the One O'Clock Lab Band during a recording session at Crystal Clear Sound Studios, Dallas, May 19–21, 2013 (photo by Michael Clements)

Background information
- Born: John Stephen Wiest; Cleveland
- Genre: Jazz
- Occupations: Musician; composer; cartoonist; music educator; author
- Instrument: Trombone
- Labels: Arabesque; ArtistShare
- Website: steve-wiest.com www.du.edu

Steve Wiest (né John Stephen Wiest; born 1957) is an American trombonist, composer, arranger, big band director, music educator at the collegiate level, jazz clinician, author, and illustrator/cartoonist. From 1981 to 1985, he was a featured trombonist and arranger with the Maynard Ferguson Band. Wiest is in his thirteenth year as Associate Professor of Jazz Studies and Commercial Music at the University of Denver Lamont School of Music. He is the Coordinator of the 21st Century Music Initiative at the school. Wiest has been a professor for thirty-eight of the forty-six years that he has been a professional trombonist, composer, and arranger. From 2007 to 2014, Wiest was Associate Professor of Music in Jazz Studies at the University of North Texas College of Music and, from March 2009 to August 2014, he was director of the One O'Clock Lab Band and coordinator of the Lab Band program. At North Texas, Wiest also taught conducting, trombone, and oversaw The U-Tubes — the College of Music's jazz trombone band. Wiest is a three-time Grammy nominee — individually in 2008 for Best instrumental Arrangement and in 2010 for Best Instrumental Composition, and collaboratively in 2010 for Best Large Jazz Ensemble Album, which he directed. As of 2013, Wiest has in excess of 58 arrangements and compositions to his credit, which include 10 original compositions from his current project (see 2013–2014 project below).

== Career ==
After attending Hattiesburg High School, in Hattiesburg, Mississippi, Wiest completed a bachelor's degree in Jazz Studies at the University of Southern Mississippi, mentored by Raoul F. Jerome. After graduation, he joined the band of Maynard Ferguson as a featured trombonist and one of two arrangers, touring five to seven months a year from 1981 to 1985.

In 1985, Wiest began graduate school at the University of North Texas, earning a master's degree in Jazz Studies in 1988. While there, he played lead trombone in the One O'Clock Lab Band, which toured Australia in 1986 and produced one live album, and four studio albums. Three of his compositions and one arrangement were recorded on Lab '86, Lab '87, and Lab '88, and another composition was recorded on Lab '89, after he graduated. As a grad student, Wiest directed the Nine O'Clock Lab Band (1985–1986), served as an arranging TA for Paris Rutherford (1986–1987), and directed the Three O'Clock Lab Band (1987–1988). Wiest studied trombone with Vern L. Kagarice, DMA. Independently, Wiest also studied trombone with Jay Friedman of the Chicago Symphony.

From 1988 to 1990, Wiest served as Assistant Director of Jazz Studies at the University of Texas at Arlington, where, among other things, he ran the UTA Improvisation Camp and directed the Small Jazz Group Program.

For 17 years, from 1990 to 2007, Wiest was the Director of Jazz Studies and Trombone Performance at University of Wisconsin–Whitewater, directing jazz ensembles, which included a standard modern big band and the university's premier jazz band: an Art Blakey-style small group called The Jazz Symposium. He taught improvisation, music history, arranging, and classical trombone. For a number of years, Wiest was a member of the Faculty Brass Quintet

Establishing a small group, rather than a big band, as the premier jazz ensemble and intensified advanced music laboratory was a pedagogical innovation of Wiest. The Jazz Symposium produced two CDs, one featuring guest artist Ernie Watts. Under the direction of Wiest, The Jazz Symposium performed at the North Sea Jazz Festival, the Montreux Jazz Festival, and King's College London

From 1994 to 1999, Wiest was a member of the Doc Severinsen Big Band. In 2006, Wiest reunited with Maynard Ferguson for Ferguson's final series of concerts: 6 nights, 12 sold-out performances at The Blue Note, Greenwich Village.

From the fall of 2007 until August 2014, Wiest was at the University of North Texas as Assistant Professor of Jazz Composition and Jazz Trombone. Wiest founded The U-Tubes, the College's trombone band. In May 2009, Wiest became director of One O'Clock Lab Band and coordinator of the Lab Band Program, after having served as interim director since August 2008.

In 2014 Wiest joined the faculty at the University of Denver Lamont School of Music as Coordinator of the 21st Century Music Initiative. Since 2016 he has served as Co-Chair of Jazz Studies.

== 2013–2014 project ==
In August 2013, Wiest, a sci-fi enthusiast, published a sci-fi novel, The Dover Stone: A Concerto for Folded Space. Wiest explains that it is built on inter-connected vignettes or movements that comprise an epic tale of life from other worlds and our place in the cosmos. The Term "folded space" is a theoretical speed of travel, faster than the speed of light, exceeding relativistic velocity by folding space, bringing far to near, reducing the long distances to a virtual zero. The tale is the impetus for ten compositions by Wiest, who describes the works as "programmatically informed" by the science fiction." The fictional vignettes culminate to answer real-life physicist Enrico Fermi's famous question, "Where is everybody?", a reference to the wonderment of life elsewhere in the universe. The stories occur in periods from 1182 to 2457.

The Steve Wiest Eclectic Electric Band will record the compositions as one album titled, Concerto for Folded Space. Wiest's compositional style ranges from straight ahead to jazz fusion, and sometimes pop-rock. With this project, Wiest is experimenting with serialism, not in a strict sense, but many elements are generated from rows.

The musical portion is an ArtistShare project and is scheduled for release early 2014. The band members are Wiest (composer and trombonist), Stockton Helbing (drums, producer), Braylon Lacy (bass), Ryan Davidson (guitar), Noel Johnston (guitar), and Daniel Pardo (flute). Guest artist are Bob Mintzer (tenor sax), Arlington Jones (né Arlington Julius Jones II) (piano), and James Pankow (trombone).

Essentially, ArtistShare is the record label and represents Wiest's foray into an alternative model for producing music. ArtistShare is a fan-funded platform where artists provide content for patrons who subscribe to access levels of their choosing. For example, on November 6, 2013, Wiest uploaded one in a series of "cool stuff", as he phrased it, to the Participant Zone of his ArtistShare Concerto for Folded Space site. The "cool stuff" included a "programmatic" analysis and complete score for "The Flutes of Glastonbury", one of the ten compositions.

Other sci-fi inspired compositions

Other sci-fi-related works composed by Wiest include "Ice-Nine", a 2009 composition scored for big band, drawn from Kurt Vonnegut's novel, Cat's Cradle. "New Cydoinia", a 2010 big-band arrangement, is a programmatic representation of all of the theories and stories surrounding the enigmatic area on Mars known as Cydonia. "A Night in Pidruid", a 2006 composition scored for big band, is a programmatic and thematic development of characters and events in Robert Silverberg's Lord Valentine's Castle. "Blues From Space", a 1984 composition scored for big band, is a novelty tune about an alien who brings a philosophy of "Sing the Blues" to Earth.

== Trombone manufacturer artist affiliations ==
- Griego Mouthpieces — Wiest uses a Griego Artist Series trombone mouthpiece designed for him called the Griego-Wiest SW Model; the mouthpiece was commercially introduced April 2013
- Edwards Trombones — Wiest performs on an Edwards trombone, called the "Excalibur", which was exclusively designed for him by Elias Christan Griego of Edwards Instruments
  For more information on Edwards Trombones, see Getzen

== Professional affiliations ==
- 1982 — Wiest became a member of ASCAP while composing and arranging for Maynard Ferguson; after a hiatus, he rejoined in 2009

== Awards and recognition ==
Academic

- 1985–1986: Bill Stapleton Jazz Arranging Scholarship, University of North Texas College of Music
- 1986–1987: M.E. "Gene" Hall Jazz Scholarship, University of North Texas College of Music

Professional

- January 2007: Wisconsin Arts Board Fellowship Award
- 2010: ASCAP Plus Award, for creative contributions to American music during the year
- Grammy nominations:
  - 2008: Best Instrumental Arrangement - for "Besame Mucho" from The One and Only
  - 2010: Best Large Jazz Ensemble Album - for "Lab 2009" by One O'Clock Lab Band; Best Instrumental Composition - for "Ice-Nine"

== Personal life ==
Wiest lives in Chicago, Illinois with his fiancé Deborah Lamberty. He has three children from previous marriages - a daughter, Amber with Pam Sonmor Wintz, and two sons, Matthew and David with Carmen Smith. His father, John Thomas Wiest (1932–2006) was a trombonist and his mother, Wanda Jean Smith Stegall (1934-2016) was a special education teacher. Wiest has three siblings, Jeanne Stegall-Keene, Robert Wiest and Andrew Wiest, a professor of history at the University of Southern Mississippi. His cousin, Nick Drozdoff, is a jazz trumpeter and music educator based in the Chicago area who also played with Maynard Ferguson in the 1980s.

== Works ==
=== Selected sessionography and discography ===
As leader

- Steve Wiest Big Band
  Excalibur
  Recorded in Chicago, August 5, 6 & 19, 2005
  Arabesque AJO180 (2006); OCLC 71803153
- Quintet
  Out of the New
  Arabesque AJ0189 (2008) (sample video)
  Wiest (trombone); Stefan Karlsson (piano), Lynn Seaton (bass), Ed Soph (drums), and Fred Hamilton (né Frederick E. Hamilton) (guitar)
- The Steve Wiest Eclectic Electric Band
  Concerto for Folded Space
  ArtistShare (scheduled release, early 2014)
  Stockton Helbing (drums, producer), Braylon Lacy (bass), Ryan Davidson (guitar), Noel Johnston (guitar), Daniel Pardo (flute)
  Featured guests: (i) Bob Mintzer (tenor sax), (ii) Arlington Jones (né Arlington Julius Jones II) (piano), (iii) James Pankow (trombone)

As director of the One O'Clock Lab Band

- Lab 2009 (CD); OCLC 501845958
- Lab 2010 (CD); OCLC 671237830
- Lab 2011 (CD & DVD); OCLC 774025959
- Lab 2012 (CD & DVD); OCLC 888207380
- Lab 2013 (CD); OCLC 888211926
- Lab 2014 (CD)

As director of the U-Tubes

- The U-Tubes (2010); OCLC 826865979 samples

As director of The Jazz Symposium, UW-Whitewater

- Presenting the University of Wisconsin-Whitewater Jazz Symposium (1898) OCLC 41887813
  Tracks 3 & 4 recorded live at the Montreux Jazz Festival, June 1996
  Track 7 recorded live at Irvin L. Young Auditorium, UW-Whitewater, February 1996
  Tracks 1 & 2, 5 & 6, 8 & 9 recorded in a studio 1996
- The best of the University of Wisconsin-Whitewater Jazz Symposium: 1996–1997 (1997) OCLC 41887538

As trombonist and arranger with Maynard Ferguson

- 1982 Playboy Jazz Festival, Two volumes (video)
  Recorded live from The Hollywood Bowl, June 19 & 20, 1982
  RCA/Columbia Pictures Home Video (1984); OCLC 11277497, 11308429
  Maynard Ferguson, Stan Mark, Alan Wise, Hobby Freeman (trumpets); Steve Wiest, Cris Braymen (trombones); Nelson Hill (alto sax); Dan Jordan (tenor sax); Denis DiBlasio (bari sax, flute); Ron Pedley (keyboards); Matt Bissonette (bass); Gregg Bissonette (Drums)
- Storm
  Live, Studio, Hollywood, California, June 23 & 24, 1982
  Palo Alto Records (1982); OCLC 10289106
- Live From San Francisco
  Recorded at the Great American Music Hall, San Francisco, May 27, 1983
  Palo Alto PA8077N (1983); OCLC 219922580, 12177630, 30868313
- Kool Jazz Festival (1982)
  Recorded live for the Voice of America on July 3, 1982
  Saratoga Performing Arts Center, Saratoga Springs, New York; OCLC 50311711, 50539572
- The One And Only
  Recorded at Bennett Studios, Englewood, New Jersey, July 25–30, 2006
  Maynard Ferguson Trust (2007); OCLC 173844972
  1. "Ain't No Sunshine When She's Gone", arranged by Wiest (audio sample)
  2. "Besame Mucho", arranged by Wiest, Grammy nominee (audio sample)

As trombonist with the Frank Mantooth Jazz Orchestra

- Per-se-vere
  Recorded at Streeterville Studios, Chicago, October 5–7 & 29, 1989
  Optimism Records (1987), released by Sea Breeze; OCLC 34834322, 724753681
- Dangerous Precedent
  Recorded at Streeterville Studios, Chicago, December 1991 to December 1992
  Sea Breeze (1993); OCLC 28959540
- Sophisticated Lady
  Recorded January 23, April 24, December 13 & 14, 1994
  Sea Breeze (1995); OCLC 36112415

As trombonist with other artists

- Arch Martin (né Archie Eugene Martin; 1931–2009)
  Jazz In Good Taste, Janelle (1993)
  Recorded in Kansas City, July 3 & 4, 1993
- Doc Severinsen and His Big Band
  Swingin' The Blues
  Recorded in Hollywood, February 4 & 5, 1999
  Azica Records & Naxos Digital (1999); OCLC 566347755, 611389358
- Ronnie Bedford & Friends
  QuaDRUMvirate
  Recorded in Powell, Wyoming, October 4, 1999
  Progressive PCD-7123; OCLC 611389358

As student trombonist and arranger with the One O'Clock Lab Band

- With Respect to Stan; OCLC 15194323, 26909870, 471680842
  Recorded at Chelsea Sound Studios, New York, 1986
- Live in Australia – The 1986 Tour; (CD) OCLC 22197060
  Recorded at the Festival Theatre, Adelaide, Australia, July 20, 1986
- Lab '86; OCLC 15194508, 471682847
  Recorded at the Dallas Sound Lab, Irving, Texas, May 1986
  Trombonist and composer of "The Miles Files" (1986) (audio from Lab '86)
- Lab '87; OCLC 22197091
  Recorded at the Dallas Sound Lab, Irving, Texas, May 17 & 18, 1987
- Lab '88; OCLC 22197083
  Recorded at the Dallas Sound Lab, Irving, Texas, May 14 & 15, 1988
  Trombonist and composer of "On the Edge" (1988) (audio from Lab '88, trombone solo by Wiest)

As composer and trombonist with other artists

- One O'Clock Lab Band
  Lab '89; OCLC 22865000
  Recorded at the Dallas Sound Lab, Irving, Texas, April 30 & May 1, 1989
  "With You", composed & arranged by Wiest (as an alumni)
- Dan Cavanagh's (né Daniel M. Cavanagh) Jazz Emporium Big Band
  Pulse, OA2 Records 22048 (2008); OCLC 299511258
  Recorded at Crystal Clear Sound Recording Studios, Dallas, Texas, March 2 & 3, 2008
- Stockton Helbing (né Stockton Thomas Helbing)
  For Nothing is Secret, Armored Records (2007); OCLC 606536674
  Recorded in Dallas, Texas, December 13–15, 2006

=== Selected compositions and arrangements ===
Kendor Music, Inc., distributor

- "Art Appreciation"
  A tribute to Art Blakey
  Composed & arranged by Wiest
  Cojarco Music, Inc. (1998); OCLC 612781983
- "The Groove", (composed in the style of Art Blakey)
  Commissioned by the Illinois Music Educators Association
  1999 All State Jazz Ensemble (1999)
- "Thaditude"
  Commissioned by the Jazz Division of the Illinois Music Educators Association
  2009 Illinois All State Jazz Ensemble
  Doug Beach Music (2009) (ASCAP)

UNC Jazz Press, Greeley, Colorado

From One O'Clock Lab Band albums
1. "The Miles Files"
  (audio from Lab '86) (live in 1997) (1986)
2. "Upside Downside"
  Composed by Mike Stern
  Arranged by Wiest
  (recorded on Lab '87) (1986); OCLC 498390714

Video sample, DR Big Band, 2007
1. "Night Visions"
  Composed & arranged by Wiest
  (recorded on Lab '87) (1987); OCLC 498390620
2. "On the Edge" (1988)
  (audio from Lab '88), trombone solo by Wiest
3. "With You"
  (recorded on Lab '89; OCLC 22865000) (1989)
From UNC Jazz Lab Band 1 albums
1. "Second Thought", composed & arranged by Wiest (1998); OCLC 498390445
2. "Gotham City", commissioned by the University of Northern Colorado Lab Band I (1991)
3. "Another Frame", arranged by Wiest (1998) (composed 1985); OCLC 222416215
From other projects
- "The Modal House of Hip Hop"
  Commissioned by Curt Hanrahan for the Milwaukee Youth Jazz Ensemble (2005)
- "Overview"
  Commissioned by Neil E. Hansen, Northwest College (1998)

Walrus Music Publishing – trade name for Daniel Franz Beher, Pismo Beach, California (audio samples)

- "The Fulton Files", commissioned by Jesse Woolery for Denton High School, composed 2012
- "Don't Give Up Hope"
  Dedicated to the victims of the 2011 Tōhoku tsunami
- "It Happened On Cooper Street"
  Commissioned by Tim Ishii for the University of Texas at Arlington
  Composed by Wiest 2012 (ASCAP)
From One O'Clock Lab Band albums
1. "Spirals" (from Lab 2008)
2. "Ice-Nine" (video from Lab 2009); (live from Birdland, March 10, 2009)
3. "New Cydonia" (video from Lab 2010)
4. "The Last Theme Song" (video from Lab 2011)
5. "Denton Standard Time" (from Lab 2013)
Written for other North Texas lab bands
1. "Puddin' Time"
  Composed by Brad Leali (née) Bradford C Leali
  Arranged 2010 by Wiest for the Three O'Clock Lab Band, Brad Leali, director
2. "Wes' Side Story" (Wes Montgomery)
  Composed 2010 by Wiest for the Two O'Clock, Jay Saunders, director
From the album, Excalibur
1. "Excalibur", composed by Wiest 2006
2. "The Silver Spin", composed by Wiest 2006
3. "Cerulean 12", composed by Wiest 2006
4. "The Once and Future Groove", composed by Wiest 2006
5. "A Night In Pidruid", composed by Wiest 2006

Maynard Ferguson Publishing and library

Recorded and performed by the Maynard Ferguson Band
1. "Besame Mucho
  Composed by Consuelo Velázquez & Sunny Skylar
  Arranged by Wiest 2006
  (recorded on The One and Only; OCLC 173844972)
2. "Ain't No Sunshine When She's Gone"
  Composed by Bill Withers
  Arranged by Wiest 2004
  (recorded on The One and Only; OCLC 173844972)
3. "I Love You"
  Composed by Cole Porter
  Arranged by Wiest
  (recorded on Brass Attitude; OCLC 40582399)
4. "I'm Old Fashioned"
  Music by Jerome Kern, lyrics by Johnny Mercer
  Arranged by Wiest 2004
  (recorded on MF Horn VI; OCLC 607863162)
Performed by the Maynard Ferguson Band
- "Smile Again", composed & arranged by Wiest 1981
- "Brother to Brother", composed by Gino Vannelli, arranged by Wiest 1981
- "Gabriel's Gig Bag", composed & arranged by Wiest 1982
- "Return of the Chameleon", based on "Chameleon" by Herbie Hancock, adopted and arranged by Wiest 1983
- "Blues From Space", lyrics & music by Wiest (1984)
- "Tyrannosaurus", composed & arranged by Wiest 1984
- "Whiplash", composed & arranged by Wiest 1984
- "Compared to You", lyrics & music by Wiest (1985)
- "Portrait of Pamela J.", composed & arranged by Wiest (1985)
- "Balboa", composed & arranged by Wiest 1985
- "Megabyte", composed & arranged by Wiest 1999
- "Step Aside", composed & arranged by Wiest 1999

Other publishers

Recorded and performed by the Maynard Ferguson Band
- "Portuguese Love"
  Composed by Teena Marie Brockert
  Arranged by Todd Cochran, adapted by Wiest 1982
  (from the "Live" performance by Maynard Ferguson), Jobete Publishing (1982); OCLC 756979151
Performed by the Maynard Ferguson Band
- "South 21st Shuffle"
  Arranged for Maynard Ferguson's band by Wiest
  Adapted for full big band by Bob Lowden (né Robert W. Lowden; 1920–1998)
  Barnhouse (1983); OCLC 26875255
From One O'Clock Lab Band albums
- "The Fifth Shade" (audio sample from Lab 2012) at 4:00
From the University of Wisconsin–Whitewater
- "Bu's Groove"
  "Bu" is short for "Buhaina", Art Blakey's Muslim surname
  Composed by Michael W. Plog
  Arranged by Wiest 2000

Unpublished

- "Hornets Nest" (1988)
  Composed as a possible theme song for the Charlotte Hornets basketball franchise

=== Jazz festivals, concerts, master classes, and workshops ===
In addition to Wiest's concert appearances at music festivals, clinics, and camps as director of the One O'Clock Lab Band, he has appeared as an artist and clinician with organizations and events that include:

Collegiate

- Northwest Jazz Festival, Northwest College, Powell, Wyoming (1991, 1992, 1993, 1994, 1995, 1997, 1998)
- Coe College Jazz Summit (1998)
- The Elmhurst College Jazz Festival (2009)
- The University of Texas at Tyler (2007, 2010)
- The University of Southern Mississippi Symphony Orchestra (2011)
- Texas Tech Jazz Ensemble I
- Missouri State University Jazz Studies Ensemble, Springfield Jazz Festival (guest soloist; 2012)
- The Illinois State University Jazz Festival (2012)
- The Illinois Wesleyan University Jazz Festival (headliner; 2011, 2012)
- Sunbelt Jazz Festival, University of West Georgia
- Middle Tennessee Jazz Orchestra
- Rowan University Jazz Festival, Glassboro, New Jersey
- University of Northern Colorado Jazz Festival, Greeley

Scholastic

- Annual South Dakota All-State Jazz Band Festival (1995, 1996, 1999)
- The Cudahy High School Band Cudahy, Wisconsin (1991 & 1995)
- Youth Jazz Ensemble of DuPage, Wheaton, Illinois (2005)
- Beloit Memorial High School, Beloit, Wisconsin (2006)
- Lincoln Senior High School, East St. Louis, Illinois (Miles Davis' alma mater)
- Badger Union High School Jazz Band, Geneva, Wisconsin
- Rolling Meadows High School Jazz Festival, Rolling Meadows, Illinois (2009)

Regional, national, professional

- The Sioux Falls Jazz and Blues Festival (2006)
- The Greater St. Louis Jazz Festival (2007)
- The Jazz Knights, United States Military Academy Band (2007)
- Albuquerque Jazz Orchestra, 2008 NMIAJE Jazz All-State Conference (New Mexico Chapter if the International Association of Jazz Education)
- Army Blues, United States Army Band, Eastern Trombone Workshop (2011)

As director of The Jazz Symposium, UW-Whitewater

- Montreux Jazz Festival
- North Sea Jazz Festival

As director of the One O'Clock Lab Band

- Guinness Jazz Festival, Cork (city), Ireland
- Monterey Next Generation Jazz Festival
- Folsom Jazz Festival, Folsom, California

=== Selected videography and podcasts ===
Maynard Ferguson

- Playboy Jazz Festival, 1982, Volume II
  RCA Columbia Pictures Home Video (1984); OCLC 11308429
  1. "Don't Stop 'Til You Get Enough", by Michael Jackson
    Arranged by Denis DiBlasio (Wiest solo at 1:44)
- 2nd Annual Budweiser Newport Jazz Festival, Madarao, Japan (August 1983)
  Source: Japanese TV footage
  1. "Bebop Buffet, Part I," a tribute to Dizzy Gillespie, Charlie Parker, Thelonious Monk, Miles Davis, and Clifford Brown
    Arranged by Denis DiBlasio
  2. "Gonna Fly Now" (theme from Rocky) (at 14:15)

Personnel includes Maynard Ferguson – soloist (leader, trumpet), Steve Wiest (trombone), Tim Ries – soloist (alto sax), Daniel Jordan – soloist (tenor sax), Denis DiBlasio – soloist (bari sax, piccolo, scat singing), Gregg Bissonette (bass), Matt Bissonette (drums)
- Live at Disneyland (1983)
  "Bebop Buffet, Part I" (Wiest solo at 8:44)

- ZDF Jazz Club, studio broadcast with live audience, Berlin (1987)
  1. "Maynard's Theme", "Body & Soul," "Shuffle Monk"
- Berlin Jazz Festival, November 7, 1987, shared billing with the Chick Corea Acoustic Band, and the Gil Evans Orchestra — multinational broadcast, ZDF
  High Voltage personnel: Maynard Ferguson (trumpet, leader), Matt Wallace (tenor & alto sax), Michael Lufkin (bass), John Toomey (keyboards), Tom Bevan (guitar), David Tull (drums), Billy Hulting (percussion, vibes, marimba, midi-mallet, beat-boxer)
  Added personnel: Wayne Bergeron, Don Hahn (trumpets), Steve Wiest (reuniting while in grad school), Tim Ries (alto sax), Denis DiBlasio (bari sax, flute)
  1. "The Market Place" & "Jack Usage" (at 11:55)
- Maynard Ferguson Tribute Concert DVD (2007), Vol. 1 of 2; OCLC 180193073
  Recorded live, September 20, 2006, Touhill Performing Arts Center, University of Missouri–St. Louis
  Personnel on Vol. 1 includes: Trumpets — Wayne Bergeron, Carl Fischer, Ernie Hammes, Stan Mark, Eric Miyashiro, Dennis Noday, Lew Soloff, Andrea Tofanelli, Walter White, Patrick Hession, Steve Schankman, Peter Olstad, Serafin Aguilar; saxes — Mike Dubaniewicz (alto), Matt Wallace (tenor), Denis DiBlasio (bari); trombones — Steve Wiest; piano — Christian Jacob, Chip Stevens, Jeff Lashway

One O'Clock Lab Band

- One O'Clock Alumni Lab Band, 50-Year Anniversary of the UNT Jazz Studies Program (1997)
  Director: Leon Breeden; saxes: Jim Riggs (lead), Dan Higgins, Lou Marini, Randy Lee, Bev Smith; trumpets: Gary Grant (lead), Jay Saunders, John Thomas, Clay Jenkins, Marv Stamm; trombones: Tom "Bones" Malone (lead), Steve Wiest, Chris Seiter, Jimmy Clark (bass), Bill Guthrie (bass); rhythm: Dan Haerle (piano), Ed Soph (drums), Jack Peterson (guitar), Tony Scherr (bass), Gene Glover (percussion)
  Solos: Jim Riggs (soprano), Clay Jenkins (trumpet), Randy Lee (tenor), Steve Wiest (trombone), Dan Higgins (alto), Chris Seiter (trombone), Ed Soph (drums), and Gary Grant (trumpet).
  1. "A Good Time Was Had By All," composed by Thad Jones

=== Other works ===
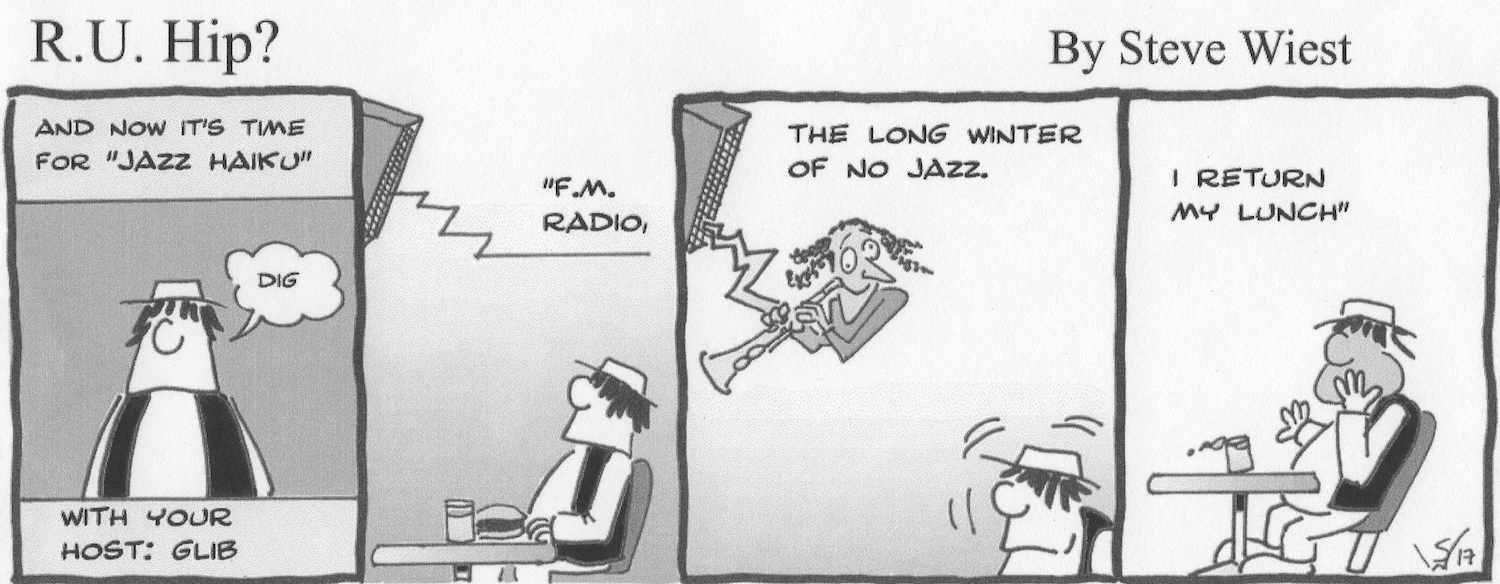

Cartoons and illustrations

1. Diblasio's Bop Shop: Getting Started in Improvisation
  By Denis DiBlasio
  Cartoon illustrations by Wiest
  Kendor Music (1986); OCLC 20568610
2. Diblasio's Bop Shop: The Sequel — Conception & Ear Training For Beginning Improvisation
  By Denis DiBlasio
  Cartoon illustrations by Wiest
  Kendor Music (1987); OCLC 24892741, 25093474
3. The Jazz Educator's Handbook
  By Jeffrey S. Jarvis (born 1952) & Douglas S. Beach (born 1956)
  Cartoon illustrations by Wiest
  Kendor Music (2002); OCLC 50031871, 850199144
4. Denis DiBlasio
  Perpetual Baggage Claim (CD)
  Cover art: Wiest; OCLC 49734502
5. Brad Dutz, Camels, Nine Winds (CD)
  Caricatures by Wiest; OCLC 32095806

Articles

6. Take the Lead for Trombone
  By Wiest
  Hal Leonard (1995); OCLC 28532540, 795288188, 221969784, OCLC 68715014
7. Remembering the King:
  A Tribute to James Louis "JJ" Johnson 1929–2001
  A Collection of Remembrances of the late JJ Johnson, by Wiest, Wayne Andre, David Baker, Matt Calvert, Bill Hughes, Curtis Fuller, Benny Powell, and Steve Turre
  ITA Journal, International Trombone Association, Vol. 30, No. 2, April 2002, pps. 14–16; ISSN 0145-3513
8. Inclusion: Slide Hampton at Wisconsin-Whitewater
  By Wiest, Edwards Trombones website (2003)
9. The Sound of Success: James Pankow
  Transcription of "Hanky Panky"
  Article & transcription by Wiest
  ITA Journal, International Trombone Association, Vol. 32, No. 1, January 2004, pps 35–37; ISSN 0145-3513
10. Focused Eclecticism: The Art of Steve Turre
  Transcription: "Steve's Blues"
  Article and transcription by Wiest
  ITA Journal, International Trombone Association, April 2005, Vol. 33, pps. 36–45; ISSN 0145-3513
11. Trombone Masterclass: Developing an Efficient Airstream
  By Wiest
  Windplayer (magazine), 2005, Issue 67, pps. 34–35; ISSN 0895-1527
12. Book Review: Jazz Bones: The World of Jazz Trombones
  By Wiest
  ITA Journal, International Trombone Association, July 2007, Vol. 35, No. 3, pg. 62; ISSN 0145-3513
13. Jazz Advocacy in the 21st Century
  By Wiest, Instrumentalist (magazine), December 2012, Vol. 67, No. 5, pps. 27–45; ISSN 0020-4331
14. Album review: The Callum Au Big Band: "Something's Coming"
  By Wiest
  The Trombonist, British Trombone Society, Autumn/Winter 2013; OCLC 30405211, 474888784, 47240055 & OCLC 224645146

Liner notes

15. Eric J. Morones
  About Time
  Arabesque (2008); OCLC 457242963
16. Paul Baker: Baker's Dozen Big Band
  Goes to Eleven
  BJAM Records (Baker's Jazz and More) (2011)

Digital media jazz advocacy

17. Created the One O'Clock website (www.theoneoclock.com)
18. Founded The Denton Messenger, an e-newsletter covering jazz and the One O'Clock
19. Created One O'Clock mobile apps for the iPhone and android
20. Founded The Blog Shed, covering jazz and the One O'Clock (swiest2.wordpress.com)
