= Floyd Graham =

American musician (1902–1974)

Floyd Freeman Graham (a.k.a. 'Fessor) (October 15, 1902 – August 18, 1974 in Denton, Texas) was a US collegiate bandleader and music educator who founded and directed the Aces of Collegeland in 1927, the university dance band, pit orchestra and stage band of the University of North Texas College of Music. He also was a violinist. The Aces of Collegeland was the forerunner to the One O'Clock Lab Band. Graham laid the groundwork at North Texas for what became the first college degree in jazz studies.

Many of the Ace's band members and Saturday night participants became a "who's who" in the performing arts – as members of famous big bands, film, and singers.

Notable Saturday Night Performers with the Aces

- Ann Sheridan
- Joan Blondell
- Louise Tobin
- Nancy Jane Gates
- Linda Darnell
- Pat Boone

Notable "Aces" Alumni

- Harry Babasin
- Bob Dorough
- Herb Ellis
- Jimmy Giuffre
- Charles W. LaRue
- William F. Lee III
- William Ennis Thomson
- JB Floyd

In 1971, the University of North Texas Student Government Association designated him as "Honor Professor," and upon retirement May 31, 1973, the regents awarded him the lifetime status of professor emeritus. He was the university's first professor emeritus.

== Education ==
Graham earned a Bachelor of Arts from the University of North Texas.

Graham earned a Teachers Certificate from Chicago Musical College in 1927 and a Bachelor of Music degree in violin from Chicago Musical College in August 1931. While attending Chicago Musical College, Graham studied violin with Max Ignatz Fischel (1878–1937) (Head of the Normal Department), ear training with Harold Burnham Maryott (born 1878), music history with Herbert Witherspoon (1873–1935); harmony and counterpoint with Hans Franklin Madsen (1887–1971), and composition, counterpoint, and solfeggio with Wesley LaViolette (1894–1978).

Graham also earned a Master of Music degree from the American Conservatory of Music.

At the American Conservatory of Music, Graham had been a pupil of:

- Herbert Dalton Butler (1867–1946) – violin
- Leo Sowerby (1895–1968) – composition & counterpoint

In Texas, Graham had been a pupil of:

- Carl Venth (1860–1938)

He also had been a pupil of:

- Fritz Mahler
- Ferde Grofé (1892–1972)

== Family and growing up ==
Floyd Graham was the son of Schyler Colfax Graham (1869–1931), a Denton grocer, and Rockie Virginia Graham née (1879–1954) Freeman. Floyd Graham first exhibited his interest in music by experimenting with a cigar-box violin while in grade school. Floyd Graham married Doris Patricia Howard on September 2, 1942. They had a daughter, Patricia (Pati) (Graham) Haworth.

== Publications ==
- Floyd Freeman Graham, Public relations in music education, a study, Exposition Press, New York (1954)
- Floyd Freeman Graham, For Music Literature, (Unknown Binding) (1965)
- Floyd Freeman Graham, For music appreciation; a course outline to supplement the teaching of music appreciation, Denton, Tex., Howard Pub. Co., Denton, TX (1960)
