= Bill Stapleton =

Bill Stapleton may refer to:

- Bill Stapleton (musician) (1945–1984), American jazz trumpeter and arranger
- Bill Stapleton (swimmer) (born 1965), American former swimmer and cycling manager
