= Bubba Kolb =

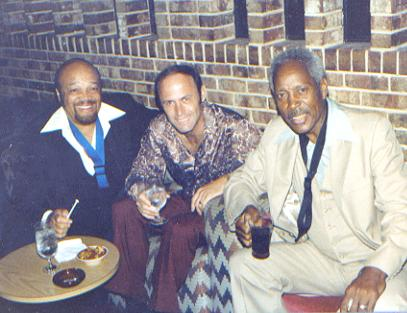
- Red Holloway, Bubba Kolb, and Sonny Stitt at the World Village Lounge, Walt Disney World; 1970s; photo by Laura Kolb

Background information
- Born: Franklin Dial Kolb; September 13, 1940 (age 85); Durant, Oklahoma, U.S.
- Genres: jazz, big band
- Occupations: leader, jazz pianist, trombonist
- Instruments: piano, trombone
- Years active: 1960s-present

Franklin Dial "Bubba" Kolb (born September 13, 1940, in Durant, Oklahoma) is an American jazz pianist and trombonist who, from 1975 to 1981, led a jazz trio, "The Bubba Kolb Trio," in residence at the World Village Lounge at the Lake Buena Vista Village, Florida. The trio backed major jazz artists appearing nightly as guests, two-weeks each, year-round. The artists included Carl Fontana, Rich Matteson, Benny Carter, Zoot Sims, Clark Terry, Urbie Green, Hank Jones, Red Norvo, Charlie Byrd, Barbara Carroll, Clark Terry, Barney Kessell, Buddy Tate, Buddy DeFranco, Louis Bellson, Marian McPartland, Art Farmer, Kai Winding, Kenny Burrell, Flip Phillips, Al Grey, Bobby Hacket, Pee Wee Erwin, Vic Dickenson, Milt Jackson, James Moody, Ira Sullivan, Billy Taylor, Teddy Wilson, Laurindo Almeida, Art Pepper, Bucky Pizzarelli, Frank Rosolino and Jimmy Forrest.

== The Bubba Kolb Trio at the World Village Lounge ==
The Bubba Kolb Trio initially consisted of Kolb on piano, Harvey M. Lang Jr. (1929–1998) on drums, and Louise A. Davis (née Stuart; born 1929) on bass. The project, originally a market test, was adopted by Disney to promote jazz with the aim of developing a venue of major rank for big name jazz artists.

Kolb also led the Disney All-Stars—with David Allen Joy (born 1953) on trumpet, Keith C. Wilson (born 1959) on drums, and Donald S. Mikiten (born 1933) on sax, and Rondal Miller on bass—at the 1986 Montreux International Jazz Festival in Switzerland. They performed July 5 at the Montreux Casino.

Bob Cross (William Martin Cross Jr.; 1917–2003), an orchestra leader who had moved to Orlando in 1971 to work as an entertainment booker at Walt Disney World, pioneered the World Village Lounge jazz concept that lasted two decades.

In the 1980s, Kolb was replaced by Donald E. Scaletta (born 1937) and Davis was replaced by Clifford Brown's ex bassist, George Morrow (1925–1992). When Lang died, Barry V. Smith (born 1957), and sometimes Don Lamond (1920–2003) took over on drums.

== Selected discography ==
- First Annual Lab Band Combo Concert, North Texas State University, Century Records 36345

Rich Matteson (bass trumpet), Wayne Harrison (trombone), Bubba Kolb (piano), Leon Breeden (director)
Recorded in Denton, Texas, December 2, 1969

1. The song is you

- Rich Matteson

Recorded in Denton, Texas, December 12, 1969
Rich Matteson (bass trumpet), Wayne Harrison, (trombone), Bubba Kolb (piano), Dave Hungate (bass), Matt Betton (drums), Leon Breeden (director)

1. The song is you

- Musica '70; Annual Spring Combo Concert Of The Lab Bands, University of North Texas College of Music, Century Records 38141

Denton, Texas, April 21, 1970
Jim Sharples (tenor sax), John Eplen (vibes, arranger), Bubba Kolb (piano), Dave Hungate (bass), Duane Durrett (drums)

- Swingin' Jazz Bands, Volume 3, Joe Venuti Quartet, Alphorn Records ALH-136

Joe Venuti (violin) Bubba Kolb (piano), Louise Davis (bass), Harvey Lang (drums)
Recorded in 1976

- Bubba Kolb, Under Full Sail NR11692

Recorded at Bee Jay Recording Studio, Orlando, Florida, 1980
Bubba Kolb (piano), Louise Davis (bass), Harvey Lang (drums), Marian McPartland (piano 1)

- Zoot Sims in Florida, Jazzbank (Japan) M1096

Recorded at the World Village Lounge, Disney Village, Florida, February 6 & 8, 1982
Zoot Sims (ts) Bubba Kolb (piano), Louise Davis (bass), Harvey Lang (drums)

- Summertime, Hugh Barlow and Glenn Zottola, Euphonic Productions, Tampa, Florida HBP1193 OCLC 683049232

Recorded in Tampa, Florida, 1993
Glenn Zottola (trumpet 1, flugelhorn, alto sax, tenor sax), Bubba Kolb (piano), Charles Silva (bass), Hugh Barlow (drums)

== Education ==
In junior and senior high school, Kolb studied trombone and arranging with Bob Seibert (Robert M. Seibert) in Dallas. He studied piano at the University of North Texas College of Music, where he was a pianist with the One O'Clock Lab Band (1969–70) and earned a Bachelor of Music degree (1971).

== Personal life ==
On February 3, 1970, Bubba married flutist Laura Ann Dean (born 1946) in Denton, Texas.
