= International Jazz Festivals Organization =

Umbrella organization

International Jazz Festivals Organization (IJFO) is an umbrella organization including 15 leading jazz festivals worldwide.

IJFO sponsors an international jazz award presented in partnership with the International Association for Jazz Education (IAJE) at their annual conferences, and rewards upcoming talents in the genre of jazz.

It was founded in 1982, when five European festival organisers met in Paris.

The recipient of the 2007 International Jazz Award for New Talent was Mathias Eick.
