= Lanny Steele =

American jazz musician

Robert L. Steele ("Lanny") (December 30, 1933 – October 21, 1994) was an American jazz pianist, educator, composer, and jazz festival promoter. He founded the Texas Southern University Jazz Ensemble.

Steele graduated from Lamar High School in Houston, Texas. He studied music at the University of North Texas College of Music, where he was a member of the One O'Clock Lab Band.

He was a pianist for Arnett Cobb. He taught music at Texas Southern University, where he created the TSU Jazz Ensemble. He also founded the Juneteenth Blues Festival (Houston), a commemoration of the liberation of Texan African-Americans from slavery. He helped organize the Houston Jazz Festival and was a co-founder of SUMArts.
