= Charles W. LaRue =

American musician

Charles Wickham LaRue (August 1, 1922 Texas – November 1, 2006 Irvine, California) was an American trombonist and jazz arranger who played with Tommy Dorsey in 1946–47, appearing in The Fabulous Dorseys film. He also played with Tommy Pederson's big band, among others. Later in life, he was one of the founders of Bones West.

He attended the University of North Texas College of Music in the early 1940s where he was a member of the Aces of Collegeland. He earned his bachelor's degree decades later in 1994 from California State University, Fullerton.
