= Dan Haerle =

American jazz pianist and educator (1937–2024)

- Born: July 23, 1937; Quincy, Illinois, U.S.
- Died: March 2, 2024 (aged 86) Denton, Texas, U.S.
- Genres: jazz, jazz/rock fusion, latin, classical, avant garde
- Occupations: pianist, composer, author, teacher
- Instruments: piano, synthesizers
- Years active: 1953–2024
- Website: danhaerle.com

Dan Haerle (July 23, 1937 – March 2, 2024) was an American jazz pianist, composer, author and teacher, based in Denton, Texas. He was professor emeritus of Jazz Studies at the University of North Texas.

== Early life and education ==
Dan Haerle attended Quincy High School. In 1953 he moved with his family to New York, where he attended Flushing High School and graduated from Hicksville High School in 1955. In 1957 he moved to Cedar Rapids, Iowa, where he attended Coe College and graduated with a Bachelor of Music Education degree in 1961. Haerle earned a Master of Music in Composition from North Texas State University in 1966.

== Career ==
Haerle began teaching in 1961 at Tri-County Community Schools in What Cheer, Iowa, where he was the instrumental music director for elementary, junior high and high school.

In 1963 to 1966, as a graduate student at North Texas State University, he was one of three teaching assistants to Leon Breeden, director of the jazz studies program.

In 1966, he became an Assistant Professor of Music at Kansas State University, where he taught freshman and sophomore theory.

In 1968, Haerle moved to Monterey Peninsula College, where he was a music instructor, teaching class piano, music theory, jazz history, jazz improvisation, and directing jazz ensembles

In 1971, he taught at the University of Miami as an Assistant Professor of Music, teaching classical theory, jazz piano, jazz improvisation, jazz history, jazz arranging and also directed jazz ensembles

In 1973, Haerle returned to New York City to be a freelance professional.

In 1975, Haerle became an Associate Professor of Music and co-director of the Jazz Studies degree program at Arizona State University. He taught jazz piano, jazz improvisation, jazz history, jazz styles and directed jazz ensembles.

In 1977, he moved to the University of North Texas (UNT) as a Professor of Music. He was appointed Regents Professor in 1992. While there he organized the Dan Haerle Quartet, including recent graduates of the university music program.

Haerle wrote a number of instructional books about jazz performance, as well as a series of jazz/rock charts.

In 2002 Haerle retired from full-time teaching, but continued to teach private jazz piano lessons and the online jazz theory course.

In 2007 Haerle was named UNT Professor Emeritus and became a member of the adjunct teaching faculty.

Haerle died in his sleep on March 2, 2024, at the age of 86.

== Honors ==
- 1992 Regents Professor appointment
- 2003 Hall of Fame – International Association of Jazz Education
- 2012 LeJENd of Jazz Education – Jazz Education Network

== Publications ==
- Jazz-Rock Voicings for the Contemporary Keyboard Player – Alfred Music
- Scales for Jazz Improvisation – Alfred Music
- Jazz Improvisation for Keyboard Players – Alfred Music
- Jazz Tunes for Improvisation (with Matteson & Petersen) – Warner Bros
- The Jazz Language – Alfred Music
- The Jazz Sound – Hal Leonard
- Jazz Piano Voicing Skills – JA Music
- Jazz Improvisation, A Pocket Guide – JA Music
- Magic Motives – JA Music
- The Essential Jazz Harmony Book – JA Music
- Six compositions for jazz ensemble – Sierra Music Publications, Inc.
- Twelve compositions for jazz combo– C. L. Barnhouse Company

== Discography ==
- "Witch Hunt (1974) – Jamey Aebersold, saxophone; Dan Haerle, piano; Rufus Reid, bass; Charlie Craig, drums
- "1965...Then to Now (1994) – Pete Magadini, drums and leader; Dan Haerle electric piano; Jim Zoechler, saxophone; Dave Young, bass. Selection: My Funny Valentine, 1976
- Seagulls (1978) – Dan Haerle, piano; Pete Brewer, saxophones; Bob Bowman, bass; Steve Houghton, drums
- Tuba Jazz Superhorns (1978) – Rich Matteson, Ashley Alexander, Buddy Baker, euphoniums; Harvey Phillips, Dan Perantoni, Winston Morris, tubas; Jack Petersen, guitar; Dan Haerle, piano; Rufus Reid, bass; Ed Soph, drums. Selections: Spoofy, Lucky Southern
- Kaleidoscope (1986) – Dan Haerle, keyboards; Pete Brewer, saxophones, flute & Lyricon; Rick Peckham, guitars; Gerald Stockton, basses; Harrell Bosarge and George Honea, drums
- Lunar Octave (1995) – Janice Borla, voice and leader; Fareed Haque, guitars; Art Davis, trumpet; Brad Stirtz, vibes; Dan Haerle, piano; Bob Bowman, bass; Jack Mouse, drums
- ...and into the light (1996) – Greg Waits, trombone and leader; David Liebman, saxophone; Larry Spencer, trumpet; Tim Miller, guitar; Dan Haerle, piano; John Adams, bass; Ed Soph, drums
- Second Wind (1997) – Pete Brewer, sax, flute and leader; Dan Haerle, piano, Fred Hamilton, bass; Ed Soph, drums
- The Truth of the Matter (1999) – Dan Haerle, keyboards; Bob Bowman, bass; Jack Mouse, drums
- Kenny Wheeler at North Texas (2000) – Kenny Wheeler, trumpet and flugelhorn; Dan Haerle, piano, Fred Hamilton, guitar; Lynn Seaton, bass; Ed Soph, drums. (Available from North Texas Jazz, PO Box 304050, Denton, TX 76203)
- Gentle Giants (2002) – Dan Ramsey, trumpet; John Alexander, saxophone; Dan Haerle, piano; Steve Bailey, bass; Gregg Bissonette, drums
- Agents of Change (2003) – Janice Borla, voice and leader; Rich Fudoli, saxophones; Fareed Haque, guitars; Art Davis, trumpet; Brad Stirtz, vibes; Dan Haerle, piano; Bob Bowman, bass; Jack Mouse, drums
- Standard Procedure (2004) – Dan Haerle, piano; Bob Bowman, bass; Jack Mouse, drums
- Everybody's Songs But My Own (2005) – Dan Ramsey, trumpet; John Alexander, saxophone; Dan Haerle, piano; Steve Bailey, bass; Gregg Bissonette, drums
- From Every Angle (2006) – Janice Borla, voice and leader; Art Davis, trumpet; John McLean, guitar; Dan Haerle, piano; Bob Bowman, bass; Jack Mouse, drums
- Aspiration (2011) – Dan Haerle, piano; Bob Bowman, bass; Jack Mouse, drums
- Live at Luminous Sound (2012) – Dan Haerle, piano; Brad Leali, saxophone; James Driscoll, bass; Ed Soph, drums
- Dan Haerle Plays The Music of Dan Haerle: with Mike Myers (2017) – Dan Haerle, keyboards; Mike Myers, drums, percussion, keyboards
- Twenty one Jamey Aebersold Playalong Recordings: Vol. 2 – Nothin' But Blues, Vol. 3 – The II/V7/I Progression, Vol. 4 – Movin' On, Vol. 5 – Time To Play Music, Vol. 7 – Miles Davis, Vol. 8 – Sonny Rollins, Vol. 10 – David Baker, Vol. 22 – 13 Favorite Standards, Vol. 30 – Rhythm Section Workout, Vol. 37 – Sammy Nestico, Vol. 41 – Body and Soul, Vol. 43 – Groovin' High, Vol. 45 – Bill Evans, Vol. 48 – In A Mellow Tone, Vol. 60 – Freddie Hubbard, Vol. 61 – Burnin, Vol. 63 – Tom Harrell, Vol. 67 – Tune Up, Vol. 71 – East of the Sun, Vol. 79 – Avalon, Vol. 109 – Fusion (Collection of Dan Haerle original tunes)
