= Mike Williams (trumpeter) =

American jazz musician

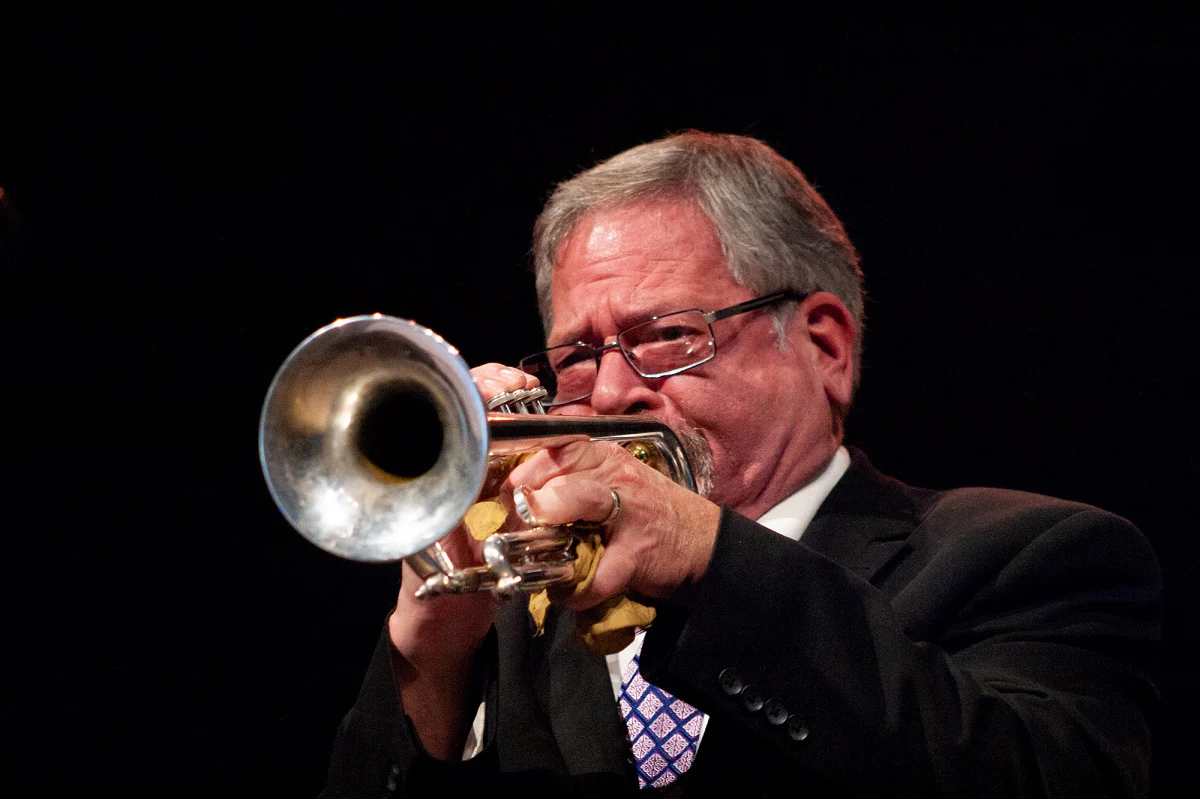
Mike Williams playing his trumpet.

Mike Williams is an American jazz and big band trumpeter residing in Lapeer, Michigan. He is most noted as the lead trumpeter for the Count Basie Orchestra, an esteemed chair which he held without interruption for more than 21 years. Mike can be heard on numerous Count Basie Orchestra recordings (some of them Grammy Award winners), including the recent "Basie Is Back" (recorded live in Japan) and the Grammy nominated "Ray Sings, Basie Swings," on which he was a featured soloist. As a member of the Basie Band, he has performed in all 50 states and 40 countries with such notable names as Dizzy Gillespie, Billy Eckstine, Frank Sinatra, Ella Fitzgerald, Sarah Vaughan, George Benson, Tony Bennett and Diane Schuur.

Mike is a native of Shreveport, Louisiana. He attended the University of North Texas College of Music, where he studied with noted trumpeter Don Jacoby, and was a member of the famous One O'Clock Lab Band. In addition to touring and recording with Count Basie, he also performs and records with other noted jazz groups, including Charles Tolliver Big Band.

Mike also played trumpet for several years with the 156th Army Band, part of the Louisiana Army National Guard based in Bossier City, Louisiana under the direction of Dr. Douglas Peterson.
