= One O'Clock Lab Band =

Jazz band at the University of North Texas College of Music

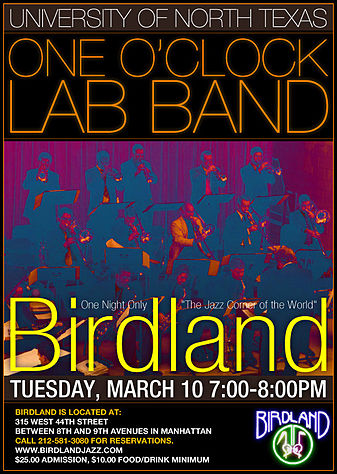
- Poster: 2009 performance in New York

Background information
- Origin: Denton, Texas
- Genres: Jazz
- Years active: 1948–present
- Website: theoneoclock.com

One O'Clock Lab Band is an ensemble of the Jazz Studies division at the University of North Texas College of Music in Denton, Texas. Since the 1970s, the band's albums have received seven Grammy Award nominations, including two for Lab 2009.

The One O'Clock Lab Band is the highest of seven lab bands at the college. The band is named for its hour of rehearsal and includes five saxophones, five trumpets, five trombones, violin, guitar, piano, bass, drum set, and voice. The One O'Clock band evolved from an extracurricular stage band founded in 1927 into a curricular laboratory dance band in 1947 when North Texas began its jazz degree program.

== History ==
Beginning in 1927, faculty member Floyd Graham began directing and emceeing Saturday night stage shows at North Texas State Teachers College, planning the programs and holding auditions every Saturday afternoon for prospective entertainers. As early as 1923, WBAP in Fort Worth broadcast a nationally syndicated show of the stage band on Friday nights. These performances were directed by James Willis Smith, professor of mathematics at North Texas from 1908 to 1927. Students in the Stage Band included Ann Sheridan, Joan Blondell, Louise Tobin, actress Nancy Jane Gates, and the Moonbeams.

"Lab Band" is the shortened form of "Laboratory Dance Band", a name given by founding director Gene Hall in 1946. "Laboratory" suggested experimenting in different configurations: band, choir, orchestra, chamber groups, and keyboard and guitar ensembles. During the 1960s, the word "dance" was removed to reflect an interest in different kinds of big band music, and "One O'Clock" was added by Leon Breeden. The academic degree Dance Band remained until 1978, when it was renamed Jazz Education, then Jazz Studies in 1981. When Breeden became band director in 1959, there were four lab bands, and they were called "units": One O'Clock, Two O'Clock, Three O'Clock, and Five O'Clock. The Two O'Clock was the premier band, known as Laboratory Dance Band A.

The Aces band was directed by Floyd Graham. The band evolved out of the Saturday Night Stage Shows that were presented weekly from 1927 to 1961. Every year from 1962 to 1970 the Aces traveled and performed with other acts for civic organizations, veterans' hospitals, on WFAA radio, and at military bases in Texas.

Willis Conover, jazz host on Voice of America, broadcast six nights a week to an audience that, at the peak of the Cold War, was estimated to be 30 million regular listeners in Eastern Europe and the former Soviet Union — and as many as 100 million worldwide. Conover, who had heard the One O'Clock Lab Band several times, including as judge at the 1960 Notre Dame Jazz Festival (when Leonard Bernstein was on the festival's board), asked Leon Breeden, in 1967, for recordings of certain numbers. Later that year, Conover featured the One O'Clock Lab Band in an hour broadcast to an estimated audience of 40 million. Every year thereafter, the One O'Clock supplied a professional quality studio engineered album to Conover.

== Major tours, festivals, concerts ==
=== Under the direction of Gene Hall ===
- 1952 – Awarded Fifth Place in a nationwide contest for the best college dance band
- Spring 1956 – "The Five Front Combo," an 8-member group (directed by Gene Hall) from the Lab Bands, appeared on NBC's Steve Allen The Tonight Show broadcast from Fort Worth
- Nov 23, 1958, 7 to 7:30 PM – Under the direction of Gene Hall performed the region's first live stereo broadcast (from Fort Worth), using two microphones, one to KFJZ-TV (Channel 11) and one to KFJZ radio 1270 AM. The producers instructed listeners to turn on both their radio and TV and place them eight feet apart. The band performed seven arrangements (stage manager, Jack Harris; broadcast producer, Buddy Turner)
- 1959 – Awarded Third Place in a contest among 183 bands for Best New Dance Band of 1959 sponsored by the American Federation of Musicians and the National Ballroom Operators Association, reaching the finals on May 11, 1959, at Roseland Dance City in New York City. It was the only college band of the final field of four. A Los Angeles group – the Claude Gordon Orchestra (with North Texas ex-student Cecil Hill in the saxophone section) – won First Place.

=== Under the direction of Leon Breeden ===
- Summer 1960 – Notre Dame Collegiate Jazz Festival; the Lab Band was Awarded Finest Jazz Group and Best Big Band and Marv Stamm was awarded best instrumentalist and trumpet player.
- Aug 14-28, 1960 – The Lab Band was the demonstration band at the Stan Kenton National Band Camp at Indiana University
- Summer 1961 – Notre Dame Collegiate Jazz Festival; the Lab Band was Awarded Finest Jazz Group and Best Big Band; Morgan Powell won Most Promising Trombone Award. Outstanding Soloists Awards given to Tom Wirtel, Trumpet; Toby Guynn, Bass; and Don Gililland, Guitar.
- Summer 1962 – Notre Dame Collegiate Jazz Festival
- 1967 – Concert tour of Mexico, sponsored by the US State Department Office of Cultural Presentations.
- June 27, 1967 – After a 30-day concert tour, the One O'Clock Performed at a White House dinner for President and Mrs. Lyndon B. Johnson and the King and Queen of Thailand, King Bhumibol Adulyadej (1927–2016) and Queen Sirikit (born 1932). In 2003, the University of North Texas awarded His Majesty King Bhumibol Adulyadej of Thailand an Honorary Doctorate in Music. During the White House performance, Duke Ellington performed with the One O'Clock, playing "Take the A Train" Stan Getz also performed with the One O'Clock at the White House.
- Summer 1970 – Served as the official Big Band of the Montreux Jazz Festival in June, the One O'Clock performed throughout Europe during a three-week concert tour.
- Summer 1973 – Serving again as the official Jazz Internatale Demonstration Big Band of the Montreux Jazz Festival, the One O'Clock toured from July 2 to July 24, performing in Vienna and Munich.
- December 9, 1973 – At the request of Tony Bennett, the One performed with him in a live telecast from San Antonio
- Fall 1974 – In an experiment that enjoyed success, The One O'Clock Lab Band entered into a three-month contract to be the weekend (Fri-Sun) house band at a Dallas dinner club, which was part of an 11-leveled discothèque owned by Ronald Jackie Monesson (1930–1995) called "Oz" at 5429 LBJ Freeway. What amounted to a full scholarship, Lab Band members were paid slightly above union wages.
- 1976 June 3-July 8 – The One O'Clock Lab Band toured the Soviet Union (Moscow, Volgograd, and Yerevan), Portugal, and England — 5 cities, 25 concerts, 77 encores, 82,800 people. The tour was sponsored by the US Department of State as part of a US Bicentennial goodwill arts outreach. NBC broadcast the One O'Clock's July 4 Concert live from Moscow as part of its US Bicentennial commemorative. While on tour, members of the band held jam sessions with musicians from Moscow, Volgograd, and Yerevan. Breeden submitted to Soviet authorities a list of 96 arrangements, with descriptions, representing 10 hours of music intended for two-hour concerts. Without explanation, Soviet censorship|Soviet censors strictly prohibited two arrangements, St. Thomas (song)|St. Thomas (by Sonny Rollins, arranged by Gene Glover) and Mi Burrito (by Raymond Harry Brown). Without announcing the names of the arrangements, the band played both pieces during its July 4 NBC satellite broadcast without incident. The tour came at the request of a visitor from the Kremlin who had been treated to four performances intended to exemplify US excellence in the arts – first the Metropolitan Opera, then the rock group Chicago (band)|Chicago, then a ballet company, then the One O'Clock. While the One O'Clock performed in Soviet cities where no American cultural group had performed, they were met by fans who knew the band from broadcasts by the Voice of America and Radio Free Europe. Willis Conover, jazz host on Voice of America, was a judge at the 1960 Notre Dame Collegiate Jazz Festival in 1960. The tour group included the first woman band member, Bev Dahlke (now Dahlke-Smith) (baritone sax).
- Summer 1977 – Spoleto Festival USA, Charleston, SC; the One O'Clock Lab Band, Phil Woods, Louie Bellson, Urbie Green, and Johnny Helms were the performers invited to perform jazz at first-ever Spoleto festival in the Americas. Since its 1958 founding in Italy by Gian Carlo Menotti, jazz had never been performed at a Spoleto event. Since its US spinoff debut in 1977 – Spoleto USA – jazz has played an integral role in what has become the largest performing arts festival in the Americas, dwarfing its Old World parent.
- Summer 1978 – Spoleto Festival USA, Charleston, SC
- Summer 1979 – Spoleto Festival USA, Charleston, SC; the One O'Clock received featured billing along with Buddy Rich, Phil Woods, and Woody Herman

=== Under the direction of Neil Slater ===
- Summer 1996 – The One O'Clock performed during a three-week tour of Japan and spent a week in Hong Kong.
- July 2008 – The One O'Clock performed at major jazz festivals in western Europe, including the Montreux Jazz Festival, in Montreux, Switzerland, the North Sea Jazz Festival in Rotterdam, Netherlands, and the Umbria Jazz Festival, in Perugia, Umbria, Italy. The tour also included performances at venues in Brienz, Switzerland, Vienne, Isère|Vienne, France, and Rüdesheim am Rhein|Rüdesheim, Germany.

=== Under the direction of Steve Wiest ===
- March 2009 – The One O'Clock performed at Birdland, New York. This was the One O'Clock's New York debut under the direction of Steve Wiest.
- July 2009 – The One O'Clock performed at the World Saxophone Congress XV in Bangkok, Thailand with James Carter and UNT alumnus Brad Leali
- January and February 2010 – The University of North Texas One O'Clock Lab Band toured California while attending the 52nd Annual Grammy Awards, where the album Lab 2009 was nominated for Best Large Jazz Ensemble Album

== Directors ==
1924–1927	James Willis Smith (1875–1937)	Professor of mathematics from 1908 to 1927, founded the "college band."
1927–1947	Floyd Graham (1902–1974)	Founded several musical groups, including The Aces of Collegeland, a pit orchestra for silent films, and stage bands for weekly variety shows – none of these musical groups were ever offered for college credit.
1946–1947	Charles Holton Meeks (1922–1976)	Grad student, fill-in for Gene Hall.
1947–1959	Gene Hall (1913–1993)	Conceived and founded jazz education leading to a degree at a university and was the Lab Band's first director.
1949–1950	Claude R. Lakey (1910–1990)	A saxophonist and student at North Texas (graduated 1950), by invitation of Gene Hall, conducted what then was the Two O'Clock Laboratory Dance Band (the forerunner to the One O'Clock). Before attending North Texas, Lakey had been a member of the Gene Krupa, Harry James (5 years, 7 movies, numerous recordings) Benny Goodman, and Glenn Miller Orchestras.
1959–1981	Leon Breeden (1921–2010)	Chaired the Jazz Studies Division and directed the One O'Clock for twenty-two years.
1981–2008	Neil Slater	Served dual roles for twenty-seven years — (i) Chair of the Jazz Studies Division and (ii) Director of the One O'Clock — the longest tenure held in either role. Among other things, Slater is credited for having developed more emphasis on small groups and adding a master's curriculum in jazz, which, according to music journalist John Morthland, improved the overall quality of the lab bands. He also formally integrated jazz studies classes with lab band experience.
2008–2014	Steve Wiest	Became the One O'Clock's fourth director March 2009, after having served as interim director the year prior.
2014–2016	Jay Saunders	Had been director of the Two O'Clock Lab Band; became interim director in 2014.
2016–present	Alan Baylock	In April 2015, the College of Music appointed Baylock as Director of the One O'Clock Lab Band, commencing Fall 2016. Baylock established the practice of including a full-time vocalist Fall 2016, and a full-time violinist beginning Fall 2023.

== Notable alumni ==
1924-1937 – Stage Band, Dance Band, Pit Orchestra; 1937-1949 – The Aces of Collegeland

- Herb Ellis (1921–2010)
- Eugene Hall (1913–1993)
- William F. Lee III
- William Ennis Thomson

1947-1959 – Laboratory Dance Bands

- Jack Alexander
- Larry Austin
- Harry Babasin (1921–1988)
- Euel Box
- Herb Ellis
- Jimmy Giuffre (1921–2008)
- Bob Hames
- William F. Lee III
- Jack Petersen
- Gene Roland (1921–1982)
- Ed Summerlin (1928–2006)
- William Ennis Thomson

1959–1969 One O'Clock Lab Band

- Dee Barton (1937–2001)
- David Breeden (1946–2005)
- Bruce Fowler
- James A. Hall
- Billy Harper
- David Hungate
- Tom "Bones" Malone
- Lou Marini
- Dean Parks
- Jim Riggs
- Jay Saunders
- Ed Soph
- Marvin Stamm
- Bill Stapleton (1945–1984)
- Lanny Steele (1933–1994)

1970s

- Bob Belden
- Leonard Candelaria
- James Chirillo
- Steve Duke
- Conrad Herwig
- Marc Johnson
- Bubba Kolb
- Lyle Mays
- Jim Milne
- John B. Riley
- Ray Sasaki
- Mike Smith
- Bill Stapleton (1945–1984)
- Frederick I. Sturm

1980s

- Gregg Bissonette
- Matt Bissonette
- Mike Bogle
- Zachary Breaux
- Earl Harvin
- Dave Pietro
- Tim Ries
- Jim Snidero
- Brad Turner
- Steve Wiest
- Mike Williams

1990s

- Tom Brantley
- Scott Englebright
- Ari Hoenig
- Lee Tomboulian
- Michael Waldrop

2000s

2010s

- Sergio Pamies

Student & faculty composers/arrangers for the One O'Clock (non-members)

- 1950: Fisher Tull
- 1960s: Frank Mantooth
- 1970s: Rich Matteson, Charles Gambetta

== Discography ==
- Denton Jazz Festival as Laboratory Dance Band (Columbia Transcriptions, 1956)
- North Texas Lab Band (90th Floor, 1961)
- LAB '67! (NTSU Jazz, 1967)
- Lab '68 (Precision, 1968)
- Fall '69 Big Band Concert (NTSU Jazz, 1969)
- Lab '69 (Century, 1969)
- Lab '70! (Century, 1970)
- Annual Spring Concert of the Lab Bands, April 14, 1970 (Century, 1970)
- Fall '70/Spring '71 (NTSU Jazz, 1971)
- Lab '71 (NTSU Jazz, 1971)
- 12 by 3 (Creative Jazz Composers, 1971)
- Live! the North Texas Lab Bands, Fall and Spring Concerts, 1970/1971 (Precision, 1971)
- Lab 72 (Precision, 1972)
- Early Tracks by John Monaghan (NTSU Jazz, 1972)
- Live '72/'73 (NTSU Jazz, 1972)
- Lab '73 (NTSU Jazz, 1973)
- Live! (Precision, 1973)
- Lab '74! (Precision, 1974)
- Lab '75 (NTSU Jazz, 1975)
- A Jazz Clinic by Leon Breeden (Crest, 1975)
- Lab '76 (NTSU Jazz, 1976)
- Lab '77 (NTSU Jazz, 1977)
- Lab '78! (NTSU Jazz, 1978)
- Texas Music Educators Association Silver (Crest, 1979)
- Jazz at Spoleto '77 (Left Bank Jazz Society, 1978)
- Lab 79 (NTSU Jazz, 1979)
- Lab 80 (NTSU Jazz, 1980)
- Lab '81 Commemorative (NTSU Jazz, 1981)
- European Tour '82 (NTSU Jazz, 1982)
- Lab 82 (NTSU Jazz, 1982)
- Lab '83 (NTSU Jazz, 1983)
- Lab 84 (NTSU Jazz, 1984)
- Lab 85 (North Texas, 1985)
- Lab 86 (North Texas Jazz, 1986)
- With Respect to Stan (North Texas Jazz, 1986)
- Live in Australia the 1986 Tour (North Texas Jazz, 1987)
- Lab 87 (North Texas Jazz, 1987)
- Lab 88 (North Texas Jazz, 1988)
- Lab 89 (North Texas Jazz, 1989)
- Lab 90 (North Texas Jazz, 1990)
- Lab 91 (North Texas Jazz, 1991)
- Lab 92 (North Texas Jazz, 1992)
- Lab '93 (North Texas Jazz, 1993)
- Live in Portugal (North Texas Jazz, 1994)
- One O'Clock Standard Time (North Texas Jazz, 1994)
- Lab 94 (North Texas Jazz, 1994)
- Lab 95 (North Texas Jazz, 1995)
- Lab '96 (North Texas Jazz, 1996)
- Lab 97 (North Texas Jazz, 1997)
- Lab '98 (North Texas Jazz, 1998)
- Lab '99 (North Texas Jazz, 1999)
- Lab 2000 (North Texas Jazz, 2000)
- Lab 2001 (North Texas Jazz, 2001)
- Lab 2002 (North Texas Jazz, 2002)
- Lab 2003 (North Texas Jazz, 2003)
- Lab 2004 (North Texas Jazz, 2004)
- Live from Thailand (North Texas Jazz, 2004)
- Circa 1960 (90th Floor, 2004)
- 2004 Midwest Clinic (Mark, 2005)
- Lab 2005 (North Texas Jazz, 2005)
- Lab 2006 (North Texas Jazz, 2006)
- Lab 2007 (North Texas Jazz, 2007)
- Live at Blues Alley (North Texas Jazz, 2007)
- Lab 2008 (North Texas Jazz, 2008)
- Lab 2009 (North Texas Jazz, 2009)
- Lab 2010 (North Texas Jazz, 2010)
- Lab 2011 (North Texas Jazz, 2011)
- Lab 2012 (North Texas Jazz, 2012)
- Lab 2013 (North Texas Jazz, 2013)
- Lab 2014 (North Texas Jazz, 2014)
- Lab 2015 (North Texas Jazz, 2015)
- Lab '16 (North Texas Jazz, 2016)
- Lab 2017 (North Texas Jazz, 2017)
- Lab 2018 (North Texas Jazz, 2018)
- Lab 2019 (North Texas Jazz, 2019)
- Lab 2020 (North Texas Jazz, 2020)
- Lab 2021 (North Texas Jazz, 2021)
- Lab 2022 (North Texas Jazz, 2022)
- Lab 2023 (North Texas Jazz, 2023)
- Lab 2024 (North Texas Jazz, 2024)
- Big & Lovely: Allison Miller with the One O'Clock Lab Band (Royal Potato, 2025)
