= Gene Hall =

American jazz educator (1913–1993)

Dr. Morris Eugene Hall
- Born: June 12, 1913; Whitewright, Texas, U.S.
- Died: March 4, 1993 (aged 79); Denton, Texas, U.S.
- Known for: One O'Clock Lab Band
- Parent(s): Benjamin Baxter and Leila G. Hall née Cook

Academic background
- Education: North Texas State Teacher's College (M.A.), New York University (Ph.D)
- Thesis: The Development of a Curriculum for the Teaching of Dance Music at a College Level (1944)

Academic work
- Discipline: Music education

Morris Eugene Hall a.k.a. M.E. "Gene" Hall (1913–1993) was an American jazz educator at the University of North Texas.

Hall was the founding director of the One O'Clock Lab Band, and responsible for the first university curriculum for the study of Jazz (called "Dance Music" at the time) in the United States.

== Early life and education ==
Hall grew up in Whitewright, Texas learning the C melody saxophone and alto saxophone.

Hall first arrived in Denton, Texas in 1934, in the midst of the Great Depression, with the intent of attending college at the University of North Texas, then known as North Texas State Teacher's College. Unable to pay the $32 for tuition, he made up the deficit by painting the interior of the university President's House.

When he initially enrolled at UNT, he was part of band that failed to find new work in Denton, and later disbanded, leaving Hall to later join another college band at the University of Texas, that got stuck in Spain after being unable to afford airline tickets back home.

His master's thesis illustrated the curriculum for a formal class in Jazz education.

== Career ==
=== One O'Clock Lab Band ===
Hall served as the band's director from 1947 to 1959. Originally called the Laboratory Dance Band, the band was established with the purpose of experimenting with different band configurations, and giving students in the newly established "Dance Band" degree a place to put their studies to practice.

After starting the band program in 1947, Hall struggled to get the band off the ground because of a lack of music to perform; stating in an interview for the University of North Texas Music Library: "When this program started in 1947, we had eight special arrangements, and sixty stock arrangements... 'bet you can imagine how that sounded."

=== Educator ===
After Hall left as director of the Lab Band in 1959, he continued being a Jazz educator at Michigan State University, College of the Desert, and Stephen F. Austin State University.

He later served as the first president of the National Association of Jazz Educators, and was inducted into their hall of fame in 1981.
