= William Ennis Thomson =

American conductor (1927–2019)

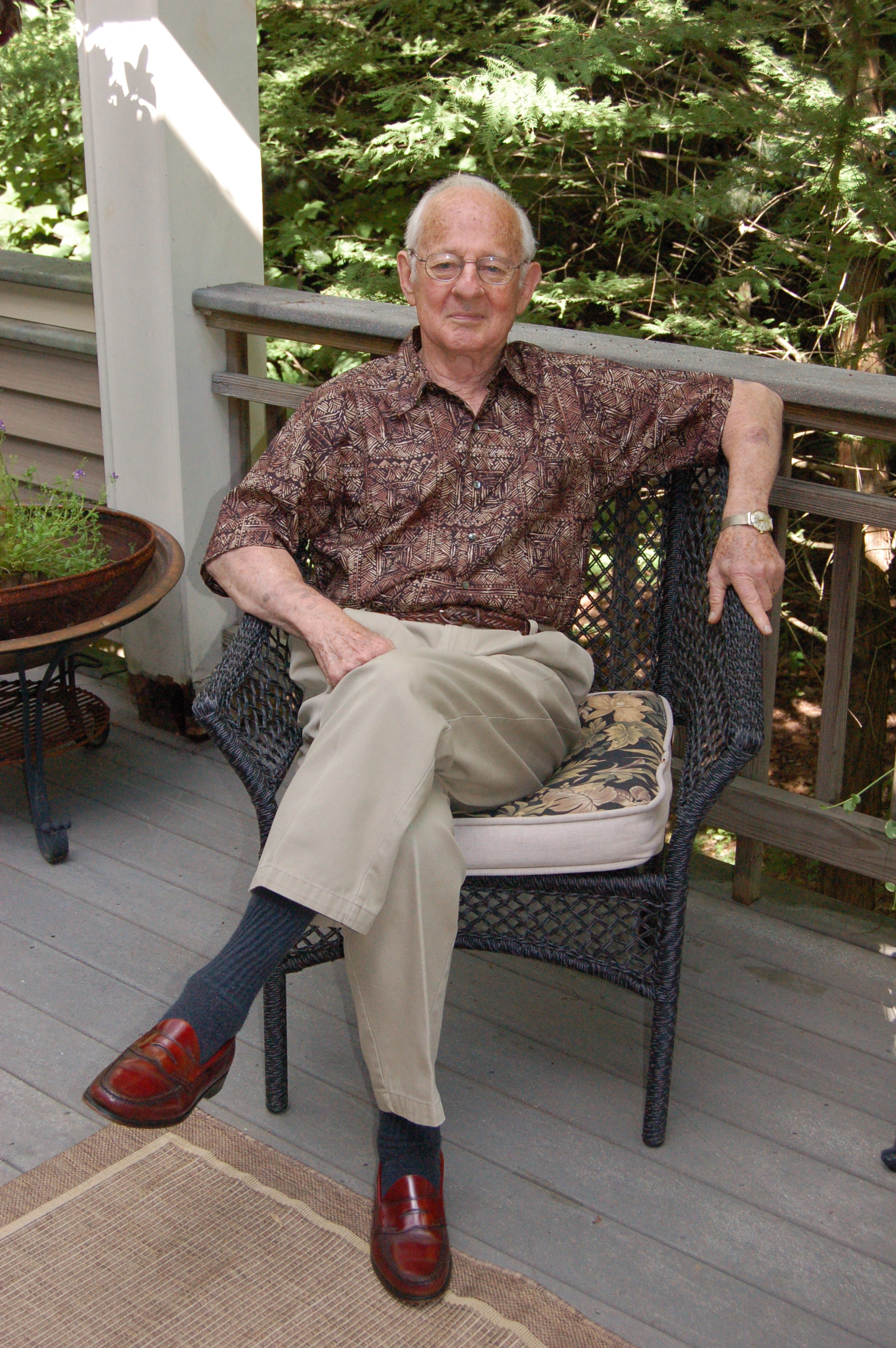
- William E. Thomson, Bloomington (2008)
- Born: May 24, 1927; Fort Worth, Texas
- Died: May 17, 2019 (aged 91); Ventura, California
- Resting place: Mount Olivet Cemetery (Fort Worth, Texas)
- Education: North Texas – BM (1948); North Texas – MM (1949); Indiana University – PhD (1952)
- Occupations: Music theorist Composer; Former School of Music Dean – USC; Professor Emeritus – USC

William Ennis Thomson (May 24, 1927 – May 17, 2019) was an American music educator at the collegiate level, music theorist, composer, former Music School Dean and professor at the Thornton School of Music, University of Southern California from 1980 to 1992. His overarching interest in research centered around the cognitive and perceptual foundation of music, insight for which is found in his 2006 article, "Pitch Frames as Melodic Archetypes", Empirical Musicology Review, 1.2, 1–18.

Thomson had served the faculties of SUNY Buffalo (1975–80) (Chair of Music and Albert Ziegle Professor); University of Arizona (Director of Graduate Studies) (1972–75); Case Western Reserve University (Fynette Hill Kulas Professor) (1969–72); Indiana University School of Music (1961–69) (Professor of Music Theory; Chair Music Theory Department); University of Hawaii Scholar in Residence (1967–68); Sul Ross State University (1951–60), and Ford Foundation composer in residence (1960–61).

He chaired the ETS Advanced Placement in Music Test Committee (1975–79); served as music panel member and examiner for the National Endowment for the Arts (1971–75, while Nancy Hanks was chairman); fellow and policy committee member of the Ford Foundation; served as a key participant in the Contemporary Music Project (1963–75); Board member of the Buffalo Philharmonic (1976–80); taught and composed works for wind band, orchestra, chorus (accompanied and a cappella); and various chamber music media. Thomson also served in the Armed Forces: U.S. Navy (1945–46).

== Collegiate education ==
Thomson was born in Fort Worth. He earned two degrees from the University of North Texas: Bachelor of Music (composition), 1948, and a Master of Music (composition) 1949. He also earned a PhD in Music Theory and Philosophy in 1952 from Indiana University, Bloomington. While at North Texas, Thomson was a member of the inaugural Laboratory Dance Band (1946–47) – the forerunner of the One O'Clock Lab Band – during the launch year of the first college degree in jazz offered in the world. At North Texas, he crossed paths with:

1. Wilfred Bain, who, as dean of the School of Music, collaborated with Gene Hall to create the country's first jazz degree program in his final year and Gene Hall's first year (1947) before moving on to Indiana University where he rapidly built another major school of music; Bain, essentially pioneered a new post-war large-scale model for higher music education by creating and integrating two comprehensive music schools within full liberal arts universities (North Texas, during Bain's era, was a large teachers college, but emerged in the late 1950s as a liberal arts university)
2. William F. Lee III, also a member of the first Lab Band at North Texas, who, later became a pioneering dean at a major music school, the University of Miami School of Music

== Compositions ==
- Viola Sonata (1948)
- String Quartet (1949) (partial fulfillment of a thesis for a Master in Music in Composition at the University of North Texas College of Music)
- Western Star (text completed by Stephen Vincent Benét in 1943, posthumously published in 1944; and posthumously awarded the Pulitzer Prize, his second, in 1944), for 3 readers, chorus, piano (or band) (1956) †
- Concerto for Clarinet and Orchestra, Alpine, Texas (Oct 7, 1955)
- Clarinet Sonata (1958)
- Permutations, for band (1961)
- Desert Seasons, Spring, Summer, Fall, Winter for mixed chorus
- Transformations, for orchestra (1961) (MENC, Contemporary Music Project for Creativity in Music Education)
1. Theme
2. Dance
3. Nocturne
4. March
5. Misterioso
6. Scherzo
- Velvet Shoes, for women's chorus (1964)
- Desert Seasons, Spring, Summer, Fall, Winter, for mixed chorus
- The Two Marys, for mixed chorus (1965)
- Fantasia and Dance, for clarinet and piano (1967)
- Praise ye the Lord (Text from Psalm 117), vocal quartet for SATB, Ann Arbor, Michigan (1968)

† The principal reader for the premier at Sul Ross State University in the 1950s was Dan Blocker, then a student in the drama wing of Fine Arts at Sul Ross.

== Publications and presentations ==
1950 PhD dissertation

- "A Clarification of the Tonality Concept", Indiana University (1952)

1960s books

- Materials and Structure of Music, Vols. I & II, William B. Christ, Richard Peter Delone (1928–1984), Vernon Lee Kliewer, Lewis Eugene Rowell (1933–), William Ennis Thomson, Prentice-Hall (1965), 2nd ed. (1973), 3rd ed. (1981)
- Workbooks I and II, Materials and Structure of Music, William B. Christ, Richard Peter Delone (1928–1984), Vernon Lee Kliewer, Lewis Eugene Rowell (1933–), William Ennis Thomson, Prentice-Hall (1965), 2nd ed. (1973), 3rd ed. (1981)
- Introduction to Music Reading, Wadsworth Publishing Co. (1966), Second Edition, Everett Books (1990)
- The Hawaii Music Curriculum Project: The Project Design, (book) College of Education, University of Hawaii (1969)

1960s articles

- The Total Theory Program, paper given at the conference on Curriculum and Supervision in Music Education, Indiana University (July 1964)
- The World of Sound and How We Hear It, TV presentation for Indiana University Television station, Bloomington (September 1964)
- Music Analysis as a Search for Universals, paper presented at the College Music Society Conference, Ann Arbor (December 1965)
- Hindemith's Contribution to Music Theory, Journal of Music Theory (April 1965)
- Introduction to Music Reading: Concepts & Applications, Wadsworth Publishing (1966) (1981)
- Review of Bence Szabolcsi's "A History of Melody", Notes (December 1966)
- New Math, New Science, New Music, Music Educators Journal, 53, (March 1967)
- Introduction to Ear Training, by William E. Thomson and Richard Peter Delone (1928–1984), Wadsworth Publishing, Belmont, California (1967)
- The Problem of Music Analysis and Universals, MENC Source Book III, 152–160 (1967)
- Teaching Musical Concepts in Ensemble Performance, Music Educators Journal (May 1968)
- Advanced Music Reading, Wadsworth Publishing, (1969)
- Music History and Music Theory Courses in the University, paper presented at the Music Teachers National Convention, Cincinnati (April, 1969)

1970s books

- Introduction to Music as Structure – Composition. Elements and techniques of music, Addison-Wesley (1971)
- General Music: A Comprehensive Approach, Addison-Wesley Innovative Series (1974)
- Music For Listeners, Prentice-Hall, 1978.

1970s articles

- Report from Ojinaga: the 1968 AIM Festival, Notes From Eastman (June 1970)
- Informal Comments on the Development of Aural Perception in a Comprehensive Music Program, paper presented at the MENC Pre-Conference Workshop Session, Chicago (March, 1970)
- Music Rides a Wave of Reform in Hawaii, Music Educators Journal, 56 (May 1970)
- "Styles analysis: or the perils of pigeonholes", Journal of Music Theory, 14.2, 191–208 (1970)
- Paris in the Twenties, paper presented at the Cleveland Institute of Music 50th anniversary party (October 4, 1970)
- The Core Commitment in Theory and Literature for Tomorrow's Musician, Symposium, College Music Society, X (Fall, 1970)
- Basic Musicianship, paper presented at the National Association of Schools of Music meeting (November 1971)
- New Challenges for the Independent Music School, paper (1972)
- "Education for the Professional", Dictionary of Modern Music, 197–200 (1974)
- "Sound: Musical", Encyclopædia Britannica, 15th Ed. (1974)
- "Review of 'Sonic Design' by Robert Cogan and Pozzi Escot", Journal of Music Theory (1979)

1980s articles

- "Functional Ambiguity in Musical Structures", Music Perception, I, 3, 3–27 (1983)
- "Review of Counterpoint in the Style of J.S. Bach, Thomas Benjamin", Journal of Music Theory, 31.2, 345–353 (1987)

1990s books

- Schoenberg's Error (Studies in the Criticism and Theory of Music), University of Pennsylvania Press, ISBN 0-8122-3088-4 (August 1991)
- Theodore Lipps, Consonance and Dissonance in Music, translated by William Ennis Thomson, Everett Books, San Marino, CA (1995)
- Tonality in Music: a General Theory, Everett Books San Marino, CA (1999)

1990s articles

- Review of Mary Lou Serafine's "Music as Cognition: the Development of Thought in Sound", Bulletin of the Council for Research in Music Education, 8–28 (Winter 1990)
- The Anatomy of Flawed Success: Comprehensive Musicianship Revisited, The Quarterly, Vol. 1, No. 3, pp. 20–28 (Autumn 1990)
- Response to Graham H. Phipps "Review of William Thomson's 'Schoenberg's Error'", Notes
- "The Harmonic Root: A Fragile Marriage of Concept and Percept", Music Perception, 10, No. 4 (1993)
- Review of Michael Friedman's "Ear-Training for Twentieth-Century Music", Journal of Music Theory Pedagogy, VII, 129–146 (1993)
- Music as Organic Evolution: Schoenberg's Mythic Springboard Into the Future, Symposium, College Music Society, 33/34, 191–211 (1993)
- Biographies for the American National Biography, Oxford University Press (1994)
1. Paul Desmond
2. Vincent Anthony Guaraldi
3. Milton "Mezz" Mezzrow
4. James ("Jimmy") Andrew Rushing
5. Elmer Snowden
6. George Wettling
- Emergent Dissonance and the Resolution of a Paradox, Symposium, College Music Society, 36, 114–137 (1996)
- "Response to Michael Buchler's review of Tonality in Music", In Theory Only, XIII (September 1997)
- Wilfred C. Bain: A Reminiscence In Memoriam, Symposium, College Music Society, 38, 1–5 (under the pseudonym Ennis Williams) (November 1998)
- On Miles and the Modes, Symposium, College Music Society, 38, 17–32 (November 1998)
- Response to Murray Dineen's Review of "Tonality in Music", Music Theory Spectrum 23.2 (1999)

2000s articles

- Those Strange Bedfellows, Politics and Music, Symposium, College Music Society (Fall 2001)
- Deductions Concerning Inductions of Tonalty, Music Perception, Vol. 19, pp. 127–138, University of California Press, Berkeley, California (2001)
- Review of "The New Handbook of Research on Music Teaching" and Learning by Richard Colwell & Carol Richardson, Music Perception, University of California Press, 20, No. 3, 341–350 (2003)
- "On the tones of painting and the colors of music", Bulletin of Psychology and the Arts, 4, 24–27, published by the American Psychological Association (2003)
- "From Sounds to Music: the Contextualizations of Pitch", Music Perception, 21.3, 431–456 (2004)
- "Response to David Temperley's Commentary", Empirical Musicology Review, I, 3, 182–184 (2006)
- "Pitch Frames as Melodic Archetypes", Empirical Musicology Review, 1.2, 1–18 (2006)
- Music in Colonial America, talk for the Jamestowne Society at TAIX restaurant, Los Angeles (May 20, 2006)
- Fractured Musicology, paper given at College Music Society Convention, San Antonio, Texas (2006)
- Metamusic Versus the Sound of Music: a Critique of Serialism, foreword by David Butler, Professor Emeritus, Ohio State University, Edwin Mellen Press, Lewiston, New York (2010)
- Serialist Claims Versus Sonic Reality, Empirical Musicology Review, V-2 (2010)

== Honors and awards ==
- 1948 – 1st Place, Young Composers, National Federation of Music Clubs for the composition, Sonata for Violin and Piano – student of George Ellers Morey, PhD (1915–1995) of North Texas
- 1971 – Outstanding Teacher Award, Case Western Reserve University
- 1975 – Outstanding Teacher Award, University of Arizona
- 1992 – Outstanding Academic Book, (for Schoenberg's Error), Choice, American Library Association
- 2009 – Alumni Appreciation Award, University of North Texas College of Music (bestowed upon two alumni from the College each year). According to the UNT Composition Department, the award for Dr. Thomson was particularly deserved because he is continuing a broad (interdisciplinary) and prolific career in music that spans beyond that of a composer.

== Military service ==
Thomson served as a Seaman (S2c; Service No. 358 74 10) in the U.S. Navy from 1945 to 1946. He was a musician in a Navy Band at Camp Elliott, California. Then he joined the Navy Band (as jazz trumpet soloist) aboard the USS Lexington (CV-16) as it sailed from San Diego to Pearl Harbor. While at Camp Elliott, Thomson did freelance arranging for Gus Arnheim, who, in the 1940s, owned a nightclub in downtown San Diego where he kept a small band going. Thomson was not permitted to enter the club during performances (he was too young); but he listened to the band playing his arrangements over the radio. Arnheim paid Thomson $15 for each arrangement.

== Growing up ==
In his younger days, Thomson learned to play french horn and trumpet, both in the classical and jazz idioms. When Thomson was five, his father bought him a cornet, hoping to stave off his interest in the piano that his sister was studying ("boys didn't play piano"). And from that age, Thomson's mother began driving him to Texas Christian University (TCU) on Saturdays for lessons with Don Gillis. When Thomson was eight, Don recommended that – since the highest paid member of any symphony in this country (after the concert master), was the principal French horn player – perhaps he should switch to horn. So he did.

The Gillis family lived in Polytechnic Heights, about four blocks from the Thomson family. The Gillis family attended Poly Baptist church, where the Thomson family were members. Don Gillis was very much involved in music at TCU.

Growing up, Thomson played French horn in Poly Baptist Church "orchestra", directed by Don Gillis. Don's sister, Eileen, played piano. The local postman, Mr. Snow, played baritone horn. A member of the Crystal Springs Ramblers, Kenneth Pitts, played violin. Thomson read the baritone part from the Broadman Hymnal, transposing it for horn.

Thomson attended Polytechnic High School, where he was involved in the band. Thomson became proficient at playing jazz solos on French horn with the Poly High School band. His high school band director was Perry Alton Sandifer (1910–2009), a trombonist, saxophonist, and clarinetist who, outside of school, performed in dance orchestras – one led by him bearing his name. Thomson graduated from Polytechnic High School in 1943.

== Family ==
William Ennis Thomson (aka Billy, while growing up) was born 1927 in Fort Worth to the marriage of William Tell Thomson (a builder) and Ruby F. Thomson (née Schwarz; a homemaker). He had two siblings: Jack C. Thomson (born 1912) and Aline Thomson (born 1918). William Ennis Thomson married Elizabeth Anne Everett on September 11, 1948; together, they had four children: Carol Anne, Mark William, Laurie Elizabeth, and John Everett. His wife Elizabeth died on July 16, 2011. Thomson died in Ventura, California, on May 17, 2019, and was buried at Mount Olivet Cemetery.
