= Scott Englebright =

American jazz trumpet player (born 1971)

Scott Englebright (born July 17, 1971) is an American jazz trumpet player. He is best known for playing lead trumpet for Maynard Ferguson, and for being co-leader of the duo "Tasteebros".

Englebright grew up in Kingsburg, California and began playing piano at age 7, and started trumpet at age 11. He attended Kingsburg Elementary Schools and Kingsburg High School before attending University of Nevada, Reno and University of North Texas. While at UNT, he was featured in performance and on recordings with the One O'Clock Lab Band playing two very difficult, high-note feature tunes, "Danny Boy" (in 1994), using an arrangement written for Maynard Ferguson by Don Sebesky, and "Maynard Ferguson" (in 1995), a song originally written for Maynard Ferguson by Shorty Rogers. One of his friends sent his recording of "Maynard Ferguson" to Ferguson himself, who offered Englebright the lead trumpet spot in Ferguson's big band. He toured with the band for a year and a half, and recorded one album with them (One More Trip to Birdland). After leaving Ferguson's band, Scott played and/or recorded with many artists in Los Angeles, including Mike Barone, Steve Huffstetter, Bill Holman, Tom Kubis, Mark Masters, Bobby Caldwell, Buddy Childers, Jack Sheldon, Chris Walden, Jim Widner, Joe McBride, and Carl Saunders. He also spent two years playing in Paul Anka's big band.

During the mid-1990s, Englebright formed the duo Tasteebros with fellow trumpet player Donny Dyess. They have released 9 CDs (and one "Best of" collection), and have co-authored 5 trumpet instruction books.
