= David Breeden =

David McKee Breeden
- Born: July 19, 1946; Fort Worth, Texas
- Died: June 22, 2005 (aged 58); Belmont, California
- Occupation(s): Clarinetist, educator
- Years active: fl. ca. 1966–2005
- Musical career
- Genres: Classical
- Instrument: Clarinet

David McKee Breeden (19 July 1946 Fort Worth, Texas – 22 June 2005 Belmont, California) was an American clarinetist who was the principal clarinetist with the San Francisco Symphony for 25 years. In addition to performing with the San Francisco Symphony, Breeden had taught at Stanford University and the San Francisco Conservatory of Music. He performed for several years with the U.S. Navy Band.

A native of Fort Worth, Texas, he had been a student of his father, Leon Breeden, clarinetist and renowned pioneer in jazz education at the University of North Texas College of Music. Breeden earned degrees from the University of North Texas (Bachelor of Music, 1968) and Catholic University. Breeden married Barbara J. Bernhard November 24, 1974, in San Mateo County, California. They had three children.
