= Ed Soph =

American jazz drummer and educator (born 1945)

Ed Soph (born March 21, 1945, in Coronado, California) is an American jazz drummer and educator.

== Biography ==
Soph was raised in Houston, Texas. He enrolled at North Texas State University (University of North Texas) in 1963 as a music major but switched his concentration to English during his sophomore year. While at North Texas, he performed with the One O'Clock Lab Band, the Glenn Miller Orchestra, and Stan Kenton. He graduated in 1968 and joined Woody Herman on a recommendation from Cannonball Adderley. He moved to New York City in 1971 and began performing and recording freelance.

Soph has worked with Clark Terry, Bill Watrous, Bill Evans, Marvin Stamm, Randy Brecker, Joe Henderson, Pat LaBarbera, Bill Mays, Cedar Walton, Dave Liebman, Chris Potter, Carl Fontana, and Slide Hampton.

He pursued a teaching career while working on the faculty at the Jamey Aebersold Jazz Workshop, the National Stage Band Camp and the University of Bridgeport. He returned to Texas in 1987 and taught Jazz Studies and Performance at the University of North Texas. Soph was inducted into the Percussive Arts Society Hall of Fame in 2016 and retired in 2017. His former students include Ari Hoenig, Keith Carlock, Chris DeRosa, Jason Sutter, and Dave Weckl.

== Discography ==
=== As leader ===
- Stamm/Soph Project with Marvin Stamm (Marstam, 2000)
- Live at Birdland NYC with Marvin Stamm (Jazzed Media, 2005)

=== As sideman ===
With Woody Herman

- Heavy Exposure (Cadet, 1969)
- Light My Fire (Chess, 1969)
- Brand New (Fantasy, 1971)
- Giant Steps (Fantasy, 1973)
- Feelin' So Blue (Fantasy, 1981)
- Woody and Friends (Concord Jazz, 1981)

With Clark Terry

- Clark Terry and His Jolly Giants (Vanguard, 1975)
- Clark Terry's Big-B-a-d-Band Live at the Wichita Jazz Festival 1974 (Vanguard, 1975)
- Live! at Buddy's Place (Vanguard, 1976)
- The Globetrotter (Vanguard, 1977)
- Live in Chicago (Monad, 1995)

With others

- Walter Bishop Jr., Soul Village (Muse, 1977)
- Dan Haerle, Live at Luminous Sound (Seagull, 2012)
- Joe Henderson, Barcelona (Enja, 1979)
- Marchel Ivery, Marchel's Mode (Leaning House, 1994)
- Dave Liebman, The Opal Heart (Enja, 1979)
- John McNeil, Things We Did Last Summer (SteepleChase, 1988)
- Matteson-Phillips Tubajazz Consort, The Matteson-Phillips Tubajazz Consort (Mark, 1977)
- Matteson-Phillips Tubajazz Consort, Tubajazz Superhorns (Tubajazz, 2002)
- Bobby Shew, Tribute to the Masters (Double-Time, 1995)
- Bill Watrous, Manhattan Wildlife Refuge (Columbia, 1974)
- Jiggs Whigham & Carl Fontana, Nice 'n' Easy (TNC, 1997)
- Jiggs Whigham & Carl Fontana, Keepin' Up with the Boneses (TNC, 2001)
- Phil Wilson & Rich Matteson, The Sound of the Wasp (ASI, 1975)

== Sources ==
- Drummerworld
- Cadenzas – Edition VIII
- All About Jazz
- Jason Sutter.com
- UNT faculty profile
- "Jubilees - March", Jazz News
