= Rayburn Wright =

Rayburn Wright (27 August 1922 – 21 March 1990) was an American trombonist, composer, arranger and conductor, and professor of jazz studies and contemporary media at the Eastman School of Music, University of Rochester, New York, United States.

In 1982 Wright produced the book with accompanying audio cassette, Inside the Score: a detailed analysis of 8 classic jazz ensemble charts by Sammy Nestico, Thad Jones and Bob Brookmeyer, published by Kendor Music.
