= William Franklin Lee III =

American jazz musician (1921 – 1997)

William Franklin Lee III, aka Bill Lee (February 20, 1929 – October 23, 2011) was an American jazz pianist, composer, arranger, author, and music educator who was renowned for pioneering comprehensive music education, including jazz, at the collegiate level. He led the University of Miami School of Music and was the University of Miami's third music school dean from 1964 to 1982.

In 1989, Lee retired from the University of Miami but continued to work in music education at other institutions. He was distinguished professor emeritus of music theory and composition and emeritus composer in residence. Lee was vice-president and provost at the University of Miami and president and executive director of IAJE.

His son Will Lee played bass guitar for Late Night with David Letterman and Late Show with David Letterman.

== Early life and education ==
Lee graduated from Kirwin High School in Galveston, Texas in 1945. He obtained a bachelor's degree in music in 1949 and a master of science degree in 1950, both from the University of North Texas College of Music. In 1956, he obtained a master of music degree in composition and a PhD in music school administration from the University of Texas at Austin.

When Lee received his masters of science at the University of North Texas in 1950, he was a member of the largest graduating class in the history of university as of that date. His studies at North Texas exposed him to Wilfred Bain, dean of the North Texas College of Music, and Gene Hall, who, in 1947 introduced at North Texas the first college degree in jazz studies. Lee began his studies at North Texas in 1945. By 1946, he was a member of the Beethoven Choir conducted by Bain, the symphony orchestra, and the Aces of Collegeland directed by Fessor Graham.

== Timeline as educator ==
- 1951–52: Director of Bands at Kirwin High School, Galveston, Texas
- 1952–55: Professor of Music, St. Mary's University, San Antonio
- 1952–55: Special Music Instructor in the San Antonio Independent School District
- 1953: Summer faculty, Trinity University, San Antonio
- 1954: Distinguished lecturer, San Antonio College
- 1955–56: Instructor of Theory and Assistant to the Dean of Fine Arts, University of Texas at Austin
- 1956–64: Professor of Theory-Composition and Director of the Music Department at Sam Houston State University, where he began the jazz studies program
- 1964–82: Third Dean of the School of Music, University of Miami School of Music
- 1972–74: Co-founder and president of NAJE
- 1982–86: Executive Vice President and Provost, University of Miami
- 1986–1989: Distinguished Professor and Composer-in-Residence, University of Miami
- 1988: Inducted into the IAJE Jazz Educators Hall of Fame
- 1989–90: Director of Fine Arts at Florida International University
- 1990–1994: Dean of the College of Fine Arts and Humanities at the University of Texas at San Antonio
- 1994–95: Professor of Music, the University of Texas at San Antonio
- 1995–99: Executive Director of IAJE

== Selected published works ==
- Music Theory Dictionary, compiled and edited by William F. Lee, Huntsville, Texas, (1961)
- Music Theory Dictionary: The Language of the Mechanics of Music, compiled by William F. Lee, C. Hansen Educational Music and Books (1966)
- The Nature of Music, a Guide to Musical Understanding and Enjoyment, C. Hansen Educational Music and Books, Denver (1968)
- Stan Kenton: Artistry in Rhythm ed. by Audree Coke Kenton, Creative Press of Los Angeles (1980)
- People in Jazz: Jazz Keyboard Improvisors of the 19th & 20th Centuries Columbia Lady Music, Hialeah, FL, distributed by Columbia Pictures Publications (1984)
- MF Horn: Maynard Ferguson's Life in Music, The Authorized Biography, Sunflower University Press (1997)

=== Music compositions ===
- Concerto Grosso for brass quintet and orchestra
- Earth Genesis for string orchestra
- Alamjohoba for band
- Introduction and Fugue for band
- Time After Time for band
- Suite for brass for brass choir
- Four Sketches for Brass C. H. Hansen (c1969)
- Fanfare for Ralph for brass choir
- Piece for Brass for brass quintet
- Mosaics for brass quintet
- Regimentation for brass quintet
- Nocturne for flute and piano
- Soliloquy for horn and piano
- Mini-Suite for trumpet and piano
- Three Reflections for alto saxophone and piano
- Interlude for guitar
- Tone Poem for oboe, violin, viola, 2 celli
- Two Woodwind Quintets
- Piano Pieces

== See also ==
- List of jazz arrangers
