= Tom Smith (jazz musician) =

Jazz musician duo

Tom Smith is an American jazz musician and educator.
