= Bill Stapleton (musician) =

American jazz musician

William John Stapleton (May 4, 1945 – July 14, 1984) was an American jazz trumpeter and arranger.

Stapleton was born in Blue Island, Illinois, and attended North Texas State University (1963–67, 1971), where he played in the One O'Clock Lab Band. He played with Woody Herman in 1972–74 as a trumpeter and flugelhornist, including on his albums The Raven Speaks and Giant Steps. He also arranged five of the pieces on Giant Steps. He then worked with Neal Hefti (1974), Bill Holman (1974–75), and Alan Broadbent (1979). In 1981 he appeared with Herman at the Concord Jazz Festival. He died as a result of alcoholism in 1984.
