= Frank Mantooth =

American jazz musician

Frank Mantooth (April 11, 1947 in Tulsa, Oklahoma – January 30, 2004 in Garden City, Kansas) was an American jazz pianist and arranger.

Mantooth attended University of North Texas College of Music, graduating in 1969, then played in and arranged for the Air Force Academy Falconaires from 1969 to 1973. He spent the rest of the 1970s living in Austria, where he published arrangements for big bands and small ensembles.

After his return to the U.S. in 1980, Mantooth worked as a pedagogue, arranger, and publisher in addition to performing. He taught at DePaul University and recorded with Phil Wilson, Ashley Alexander, and Kirsten Gustafson. He wrote music for Louie Bellson, Art Farmer, and Carla Helmbrecht. In 2004 he died from a heart attack at the age of 56 at his home in Garden City, Kansas.

The week that Frank died and in his honor, Jim Warrick (Director of Jazz Studies at New Trier High School in Winnetka, Il), renamed the "New Trier High School Jazz Festival" to the "Frank Mantooth Jazz Festival at New Trier High School". Frank had been a frequent performer and clinician at the festival since Warrick created it in 1983. The annual non-competitive jazz festival continues today by presenting 50 high school and junior high school jazz ensemble on the first Saturday in November to perform. Also included is 10 special interest clinics during the day, performances by a college jazz ensemble and a professional combo. The festival concludes with an evening concert by the New Trier High School Jazz Ensemble I, and an internationally-known professional big band such as the Maria Schnieder Jazz Orchestra, The Lincoln Center Jazz Ensemble directed by Wynton Marcellis, the Count Basie Orchestra (5 times), the Gordon Goodwin's Big Phat Band, the Woody Herman Jazz Orchestra (2 times), Dizzy Gillespie and his alumni band, the Maynard Ferguson Alumni Band with Maynard Ferguson, and 45 other big bands with such highly historical and professional importance. The entire festival is streamed online from 8 am to 11 p.m. on the first Saturday in February on NTTV - New Trier High School

== Discography ==
- Our First (Fontana, 1978)
- Suite Tooth (Optimism, 1989)
- Persevere (Optimism, 1990)
- Dangerous Precedent (Sea Breeze, 1993)
- Sophisticated Lady (Sea Breeze, 1995)
- A Miracle (Sea Breeze, 1999)
- Ladies Sing for Lovers (MCG Jazz, 2005)

With Ashley Alexander

- Ashley Alexander Plays Frank Mantooth (AM-PM, 1982)
- Powerslide (Pausa, 1985)
- Seems Like Old Times (Chase, 1987)

== Publications ==
- Voicings for Jazz Keyboard
- Currently published music for jazz ensemble A Most Pleasant Reunion (2015) A Nightingale Sang in Berkeley Square America, the Beautiful Angelika (2025) Anything Goes Ballad For A Rough Year (2011) But Beautiful Chromatic Cro-Magnon (2025) Council Grove Groove (2024) Harlem Nocturne If I Were A Bellson (2018) In Retrospect (2023) Invitation Jillian (2017) Lauralisa (2023) Leo Long In The Tooth (2008) Luck of the Irish (2016) Midnight Sun (2006) Mixolydian Soul Frog (2008) Moment's Notice On Green Dolphin Street Perdido Shoehorn Shuffle (2009) Stapes (2013) Stella by Starlight (2007) the Fool on the Hill / Blackbird The Lightly Camouflaged Samba (2010) The Sage of Dupage The Studs of War This Masquerade To a Forgotten Friend (2023) Too Young Undecided Wave What a Diff'rence a Day Made (2018) Where the Buffalo Roam (2007) White Pontiac (2008) Young and Foolish Your Sister's Samba (2000)
