= Wilfred Conwell Bain =

American collegiate music educator (1908-1997)

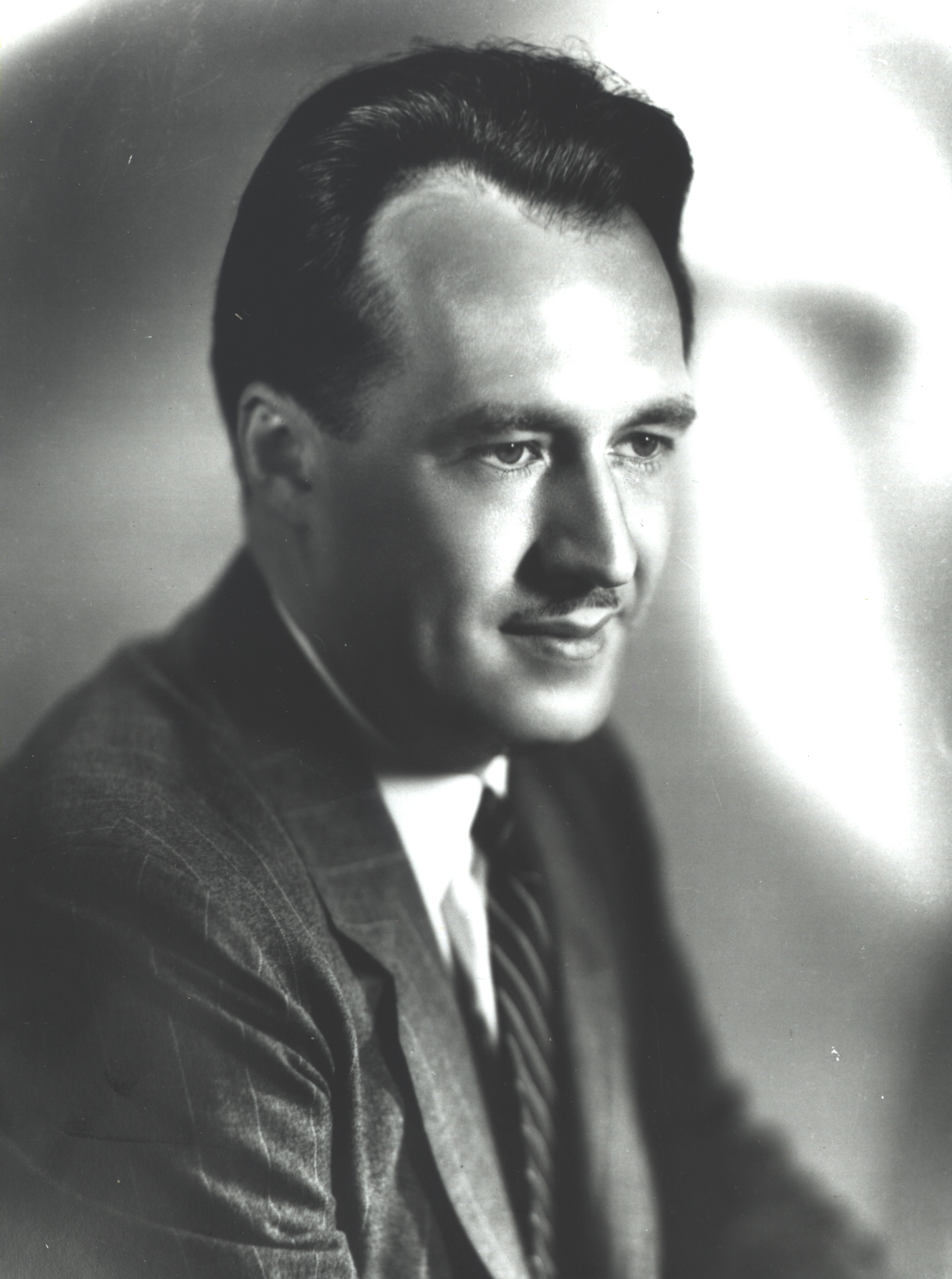
- Bain c. 1940s
- Born: July 20, 1908; Shawville, Quebec
- Died: March 7, 1997 (aged 89); Bloomington, Indiana
- Education: A.B., Houghton College (1929) B.M., Westminster Choir College (1931); M.A., Music Ed., NYU (1936) Ed.D., Mus. Ed., NYU School of Education (1938)
- Occupations: Opera workshop director Music educator Music school dean University of North Texas; Indiana University
- Partner(s): Mary E. Freeman (1905–1993); Betty Myers
- Parent(s): James Alexander Bain; Della Hawn (born 1881)

Wilfred Conwell Bain (January 20, 1908 – March 7, 1997) was an American music educator, a university level music school administrator (former Dean of two major music schools spanning 35 years), and an opera theater director at the collegiate level. Bain is widely credited for rapidly transforming to national prominence both the University of North Texas College of Music as dean from 1938 to 1947, and later, Indiana University School of Music as dean from 1947 to 1973. Both institutions are major comprehensive music schools with the largest and second largest enrollments, respectively, of all music schools accredited by the National Association of Schools of Music. He was born in Shawville, Quebec, and died in Bloomington, Indiana.

James R. Oestreich, classical music critic for The New York Times, referred to Bain as a "legend" who lifted the Jacobs School of Music to national prominence from 1947 to 1973.

== Contributions to collegiate schools of music ==
At two public institutions, Bain put all three models together into comprehensive music schools with the critical mass (large enrollments) needed for major productions in opera, large chorus, and symphony orchestras. And, Bain integrated these large, comprehensive music schools within their host colleges: first at the University of North Texas (then the nation's largest public teachers college that was emerging as a liberal arts university), second at Indiana University at Bloomington. Putting talent aside, Bain strongly felt that a music degree from a comprehensive music school that was embedded within a liberal arts university was a more powerful degree (from an interdisciplinary, rounding perspective), for both undergraduate and graduate students. Bain capitalized on the intellectual assets inherent of a university. The science core requirement, for example, might offer musical acoustics taught by physics professors. The English departments and theater wings might collaborate with the composition department. The music schools of North Texas and Indiana, often, were beneficiaries of talented students not majoring in music (Michael Brecker, while at Indiana, declared English as his major).

=== Focus on vocal and opera ===
Until Bain, opera education (capable of producing fully mounted operas) was a discipline relegated to conservatories in urban settings. While at North Texas, and more so while at Indiana University, Bain not only stressed opera, he built enrollments, quality, and performance-frequency to levels never witnessed in their respective regions (audiences were, of course, familiar with professional touring companies, such as the Charles Wagner Company). Bain viewed opera as the "perfect vehicle for the musical experience – for the student, for the faculty, and for the audience." He said that "Opera is the crossroads where they all meet." "And, opera is the public review of a music school's total work." Bain believed that, at Indiana, he had built a great music school, in part because of its size, which allowed it to achieve the critical mass, the power and drive of a faculty and hundreds of talented students.

=== The construction of the university opera hall ===
When the Musical Arts Center at Indiana officially opened in April 1972, it was the first of its kind at a university. Before then, there were performance venues at universities with great aesthetics and acoustics (such as Frank Lloyd Wright's Gammage at Arizona State University), but few equipped specifically for both education and state-of-the-art professional level opera productions. The hall's proscenium is 69 feet (15 feet longer than that of the Met). Like the Met, the hall has four stages: The main (90 by 60 feet), two side stages (50 by 50 by 28), and a rear stage (which holds a 48-foot turntable and allows the front stage to increase its depth by an additional 55 feet). The side and rear stages are equipped electrically controlled wagons on which complete sets can be assembled and them moved onto the main stage. And on the main stage, there are traps every 6 feet. The house's pit is on elevators and is 55 by 60 feet. The lighting equipment was, at the time, sophisticated, capable of presetting over 200 cues. The hall has a full audio/visual recording studio with facilities for live radio and TV broadcasts. Bain saw the facility not as a gigantic auditorium, but as a giant, varied classroom. There are dozens of rooms for rehearsals and classrooms (two that are large enough for orchestra and chorus), three for ballet, and several of identical size for staging rehearsals. A typical production could involve 200 students, faculty and staff. And, while one work is being performed, several others can be in rehearsal simultaneously. Bain felt that the hall was as good as that of the Metropolitan Opera, if not in many ways superior. Although the Met seats 3,700 while IU's hall seats 1,450, Bain regarded it as an advantage because (i) it makes possible a more intimate theatrical experience for the audience, (ii) it doubles the need for performances (good for double casting and student musicians needing experience), and (iii) it puts less strain on young voices.

== Positions held ==
- 1929–30 – head of the music department, Southern Wesleyan University, Central, SC
- 1931–38 – head of voice and choral music, Houghton College
- 1938–47 – dean, University of North Texas College of Music, Denton
- Jan 1941–? – national vice-president and member of the executive committee, National Association of Schools of Music
- 1947–73 – dean, Indiana University School of Music, Bloomington
- 1965–67 – trustee, Westminster Choir College
- 1967 – chairman, music advisory panel, USIA
- 1973–78 – artistic director, Opera Theater, Indiana University School of Music
- 1973–97 – professor emeritus, Indiana University
- Music Adviser, member of the board, Coolidge Foundation
- 1979–97 – VP board of directors, Palm Beach Opera (Florida)
- President, American Friends of Bayreuth
- President and secretary, Music Teachers National Association

== Baccalaureate and post-baccalaureate education ==
- 1929 — A.B., Houghton College
- 1931 — Bachelor of Music, Westminster Choir College (then also known as Williamson School of Church Music, Ithaca)
- 1936 — Master of Arts, Music Education, New York University
- 1938 — Ed.D., Music Education, New York University School of Education

Bain had been a pupil of John Finley Williamson, Father William J. Finn (1881–1961; former choirmaster of Manhattan's Church of St. Paul the Apostle), Isidore Luckstone (1861–1941), Hollis Dean, and Percy Grainger

EdD Thesis Wilfred Conwell Bain, The status and function of a cappella choirs in colleges and universities in the United States, New York University School of Education (1938)

== Personal life ==
Bain was born to James Alexander Bain (1883–1960), a Methodist minister, and Della Bain, née Hawn (1881–1965). The couple married February 15, 1905 in Renfrew County, Ontario. They had three other children: Howard Erskine Bain (1906–1988), Donald John Bain (born 1912) and Doris Evelyn Bain (1917–2010), (aka Doris Bain Thompson, wife of Dean V. Thompson) Doris Bain earned a bachelor of music in 1938 from Houghton College as well a second baccalaureate degree from Westminster Choir College in Princeton NJ and a master's degree in music education from the UNT College of Music and became a music educator with emphasis in choral music. In May 1918, Bain immigrated to the United States with his parents, crossing the Canadian-American border at Ogdensburg, New York.

On July 1, 1929, Bain married Mary Elizabeth Freeman (1905–1993). On November 27, 1941, he became a naturalized U.S. citizen during a ceremony in Federal Court in Sherman, Texas He later married Elisabeth Bain (aka Betty Myers Bain, née Elisabeth Perkins; born 1918); widow of John Holmes Myers, PhD, CPA (1915–1993), former Indiana University Professor Emeritus Accounting. Betty is a prolific author of young people's books, particularly in areas of U.S. history. Betty had one son from her previous marriage, Thomas Perkins Myers (of Lincoln, NE).
