= Leon Breeden =

- Born: Harold Leon Breeden; October 3, 1921; Guthrie, Oklahoma, U.S.
- Died: August 11, 2010 (aged 88) Dallas, Texas
- Genres: Jazz, classical
- Occupations: Educator, musician, composer
- Instrument: Clarinet
- Formerly of: One O'Clock Lab Band

Harold Leon Breeden (3 October 1921 – 11 August 2010) was a jazz educator and musician.

== Biography ==
When he was three his parents moved to Wichita Falls, Texas, where he grew up and graduated from high school. He attended Texas Wesleyan College in Fort Worth on a scholarship and later transferred to Texas Christian University where he completed both his bachelor's and master's degrees. While doing graduate work at Columbia University in New York City, he studied clarinet with Reginald Kell who had immigrated to the U.S. in 1948. Benny Goodman began studies with Kell in 1949.

In 1944, after military duty, he became the Director of Bands at Texas Christian University and later served as Director of Bands at Grand Prairie High School from 1953 to 1959. In 1959, M.E. "Gene" Hall, Founding Director of Jazz Studies at the University of North Texas College of Music, recommended Breeden to replace Hall as Director of Jazz Studies, where Breeden remained until his retirement in 1984. A classically trained clarinetist, Breeden also played saxophone and studied composition and arranging at Texas Christian. He was a teaching assistant under Don Gillis, whom he worked with in New York City from 1950 to 1952 as his assistant. He married Bonna Joyce McKee, whom he had met while working on his master's degree at Texas Christian.

Gillis was producer of the NBC Symphony, conducted by Arturo Toscanini. Breeden met with and wrote arrangements for Arthur Fiedler, conductor of the Boston Pops. Gillis recommended Breeden for work. In 1950, after hearing his first arrangements for the group, Fiedler offered Breeden a position as staff writer and arranger for the orchestra, but with an ill father, Breeden declined and moved back to Texas. He worked as music coordinator for KXAS-TV in Fort Worth, known at the time as WBAP-TV.

In the last several years of his life, Breeden frequently soloed on clarinet with The Official Texas Jazz Orchestra. In 2009, The University of North Texas awarded Breeden with an honorary Doctor of Humane Letters degree.

Breeden died of natural causes on August 11, 2010, in Dallas. The Associated Press release of Breeden's death referred to him as a legendary director who made the One O'Clock Lab Band internationally famous.
