= William Shatner filmography and discography =

William Shatner filmography
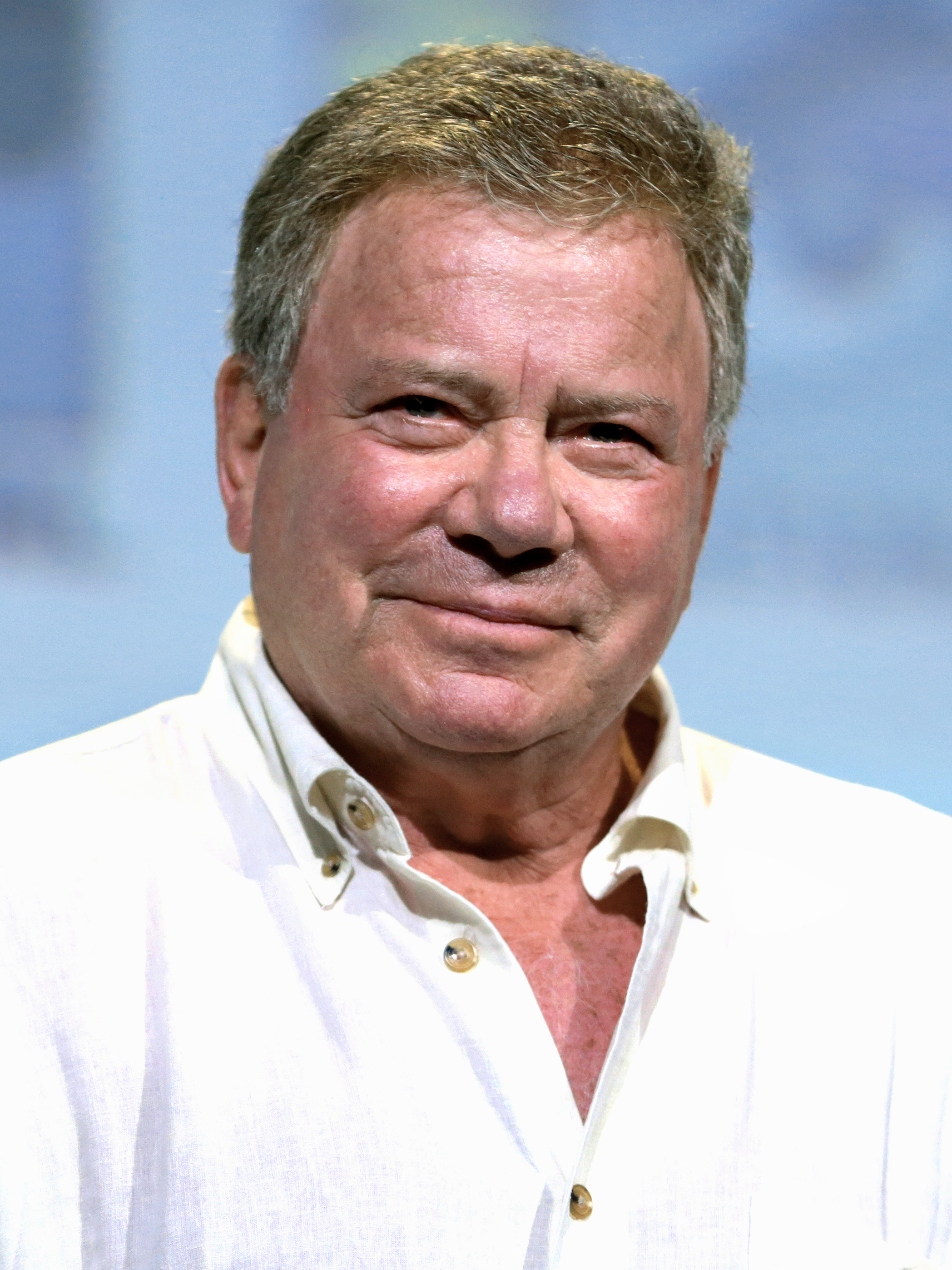
- Film: 65
- Television series: 111
- Advertising: 12
- Others: 8

William Shatner (born 1931) is a Canadian actor who has had a career in film and television for seven decades. Shatner's breakthrough role was his portrayal of James T. Kirk in Star Trek.

== Film ==
Year	Title	Role	Notes	Ref(s)
1951	The Butler's Night Off	Crook		
1957	Oedipus the King	Chorus		
1958	The Brothers Karamazov	Alexey Karamazov		
1961	The Explosive Generation	Peter Gifford		
1961	Judgment at Nuremberg	Captain Harrison Byers		
1962	The Intruder	Adam Cramer		
1964	The Outrage	Preacher		
1965	Incubus	Marc		
1968	White Comanche	Johnny Moon / Notah		
1974	Impulse	Matt Stone		
1974	Big Bad Mama	William J. Baxter		
1974	West Point on the Hudson	Narrator	Documentary	
1975	Patent Pending	Narrator	Documentary film about patents	
1975	The Devil's Rain	Mark Preston		
1976	A Whale of a Tale	Dr. Jack Fredericks		
1977	Mysteries of the Gods	Host/narrator	Documentary	
1977	Kingdom of the Spiders	Rack Hansen		
1978	Land of No Return	Curt Bunell		
1978	The Third Walker	Munro Maclean		
1979	Star Trek: The Motion Picture	James T. Kirk		
1980	The Kidnapping of the President	Jerry O'Connor		
1982	Visiting Hours	Gary Baylor		
1982	Airplane II: The Sequel	Commander Buck Murdock		
1982	Star Trek II: The Wrath of Khan	James T. Kirk		
1984	Star Trek III: The Search for Spock	James T. Kirk		
1986	Star Trek IV: The Voyage Home	James T. Kirk		
1989	Star Trek V: The Final Frontier	James T. Kirk	Also director and story co-writer	
1991	Star Trek VI: The Undiscovered Country	James T. Kirk		
1993	Loaded Weapon 1	General Mortars		
1994	Star Trek Generations	James T. Kirk		
1995	Trinity and Beyond	Narrator	Documentary	
1998	Land of the Free	Aidan Carvell		
1998	Free Enterprise	Bill		
2000	Miss Congeniality	Stan Fields		
2000	Falcon Down	Major Robert Carson		
2001	Osmosis Jones	Mayor Phlegmming	Voice	
2001	Mind Meld: Secrets Behind the Voyage of a Lifetime	Co-host	Documentary; Direct-to-video, also producer	
2002	Shoot or Be Shot	Harvey Wilkes		
2002	Showtime	Himself		
2002	American Psycho 2	Robert Starkman		
2002	Groom Lake	John Gossner	Also director and co-writer	
2004	DodgeBall: A True Underdog Story	Dodgeball Chancellor		
2005	Lil' Pimp	Tony Gold	Voice, direct-to-video	
2005	Miss Congeniality 2: Armed and Fabulous	Stan Fields		
2006	The Wild	Kazar	Voice	
2006	Over the Hedge	Ozzie	Voice	
2006	Stalking Santa	Narrator		
2008	Gotta Catch Santa Claus	Santa Claus	Voice	
2009	Fanboys	Himself		
2009	William Shatner's Gonzo Ballet	Himself		
2009	The True History of Puss 'N Boots	Puss 'N Boots	Voice	
2010	Quantum Quest: A Cassini Space Odyssey	Core	Voice	
2010	Horrorween	Himself		
2011	Corman's World: Exploits of a Hollywood Rebel	Interviewee	Documentary	
2011	The Captains	Host	Documentary; Also director and producer	
2012	Get A Life!	Host	Documentary; Also writer, director and co-producer	
2013	Escape from Planet Earth	Gen. William T. Shanker	Voice	
2014	William Shatner Presents: Chaos on the Bridge	Host	Documentary; Also writer, director and co-producer	
2014	To Be Takei	Himself	Documentary	
2015	A Christmas Horror Story	Dangerous Dan		
2015	A Sunday Horse	Kenneth Roubidoux		
2015	When Elephants Were Young	Narrator	Documentary	
2015	Being Canadian	Himself	Documentary	
2016	For the Love of Spock	Himself	Documentary	
2016	Range 15	Richard Chindler		
2017	Batman vs. Two-Face	Harvey Dent / Two-Face	Voice, direct-to-video	
2017	The Truth is in the Stars	Narrator Host		
2018	Aliens Ate My Homework	Phil the Plant	Voice	
2019	Creators: The Past	Lord Ogmha		
2019	To Your Last Death	The Overseer	Voice	
2019	Devil's Revenge	Hayes	Also co-writer	
2021	Senior Moment	Victor Martin		
2022	Fireheart	Jimmy Murray	Voice	
2024	William Shatner: You Can Call Me Bill	Himself	Documentary; Narrator and main role	
2024	765874 – Unification	James T. Kirk	Short film	

== Television ==
Year	Title	Role	Notes	Ref(s)
1954	The Canadian Howdy Doody Show	Ranger Bob		
1955	Encounter	Lucky / Billy Budd	2 episodes	
1957	Studio One	Dr. David Coleman / Kenneth Preston / Dr. Franck	5 episodes, including The Defender	
1957	Alfred Hitchcock Presents	Jim Whitely	Episode: "The Glass Eye"	
1958	Playhouse 90	Jerry Paul	Episode: A Town Has Turned to Dust	
1958	The Ed Sullivan Show	Robert Lomax	November 16, 1958 episode; portrayed Robert Lomax on an in-show portrayal of The World of Suzie Wong	
1959	Nero Wolfe	Archie Goodwin	"Count the Man Down" - unsold pilot.	
1960	Alfred Hitchcock Presents	John Crane	Episode: "Mother, May I Go Out to Swim?"	
1960	One Step Beyond	Carl Bremer	Episode: "The Promise"	
1960–1963	The Twilight Zone	Bob Wilson / Don Carter	2 episodes	
1961	Thriller	Paul Graves / Gil Thrasher	2 episodes	
1961–1965	The Defenders	Various	5 episodes	
1962	Naked City	Maung Tun / Roger Barme	2 episodes	
1963	Alexander the Great	Alexander the Great	Television pilot	
1963	Premiere - Presented by Fred Astaire	Doctor Lloyd	Episode: "Million Dollar Hospital"	
1963	The Nurses	Dr. Adam Courtlandt	Episode: "A Question of Mercy"	
1963	Route 66	Menemsha Faxon	Episode: "Build Your Houses with Their Backs to the Sea"	
1964	The Outer Limits	Brig. Gen. Jeff Barton	Episode: "Cold Hands, Warm Heart"	
1964	The Man from U.N.C.L.E.	Michael Donfield	Episode: "The Project Strigas Affair"	
1964	Burke's Law	Arthur Reynolds	Episode: "Who Killed Carrie Cornell?"	
1965	The Fugitive	Tony Burrell	Episode: "Stranger in the Mirror"	
1965	For the People	David Koster	13 episodes	
1965	Twelve O'Clock High	Major Kurt Brown	Episode: "I Am the Enemy"	
1965–1969	The Virginian	Henry Swann / Luke Milford	2 episodes	
1966	The Big Valley	Brett Skyler	Episode: "A Time to Kill"	
1966	Gunsmoke	Fred Bateman	Episode: "Quaker Girl"	
1966	Dr. Kildare	Dr. Carl Noyes / Toby Cunningham, M.D.	6 episodes	
1966–1969	Star Trek: The Original Series	James T. Kirk	Main role; 3 seasons	
1969	Medical Center	Dr. Eli Neily	Episode: "The Combatants"	
1970	Sole Survivor	Lt. Col. Josef Gronke	Television film	
1970	The F.B.I.	Artie	Episode: "Antennae of Death"	
1970	The Andersonville Trial	Lt. Col. Chipman	Television film	
1970–1974	Ironside	Bill Parkins / Don Brand / Marty Jessup	4 episodes	
1971	Vanished	Dave Paulick	Two-part made-for-TV movie (NBC)	
1971–1972	Owen Marshall: Counselor at Law	Gary / District Attorney Dave Blankenship	2 episodes	
1971–1972	Mission: Impossible	Tommy Kroll / Joe Conrad	2 episodes	
1972	The Hound of the Baskervilles	George Stapleton	Television film	
1972	The People	Dr. Curtis	Television film	
1972	Hawaii Five-O	Sam Tolliver	Episode: "You Don't Have to Kill to Get Rich, but It Helps"	
1972	The Sixth Sense	Edwin Danbury	Episode: "Can a Dead Man Strike from the Grave?"	
1972	Four Economic Functions of Capitalism	William Shatner	Four-part made-for-TV documentary (Phillips Petroleum)	
1973–1974	Star Trek: The Animated Series	James T. Kirk	Voice	
1973–1974	Taylor's Inner Space	Narrator	Television series by Ron and Valerie Taylor	
1973	Incident on a Dark Street	Deaver G. Wallace	Television film	
1973	The Horror at 37,000 Feet	Paul Kovalik	Television film	
1973	Barnaby Jones	Phil Carlyle / Fred Williams	Episode: "To Catch a Dead Man"	
1973	Mannix	Adam Langer	Episode: "Search For a Whisper"	
1973	Go Ask Alice	Sam	Television film	
1973	Pioneer Woman	Johnny Sergeant	Television film	
1974	Indict and Convict	Sam Belden	Television film	
1974	Pray for the Wildcats	Warren Summerfield	Television film	
1974	The Six Million Dollar Man	Josh Lang	Episode: "Burning Bright"	
1974	Flick Flack	Host		
1974	Police Story	Sgt. Bill Keitlinger	Episode: "Love, Mabel"	
1974	Kung Fu	Captain Brandywine Gage	Episode: "A Small Beheading"	
1975–1976	Barbary Coast	Jeff Cable	14 episodes	
1976	The Tenth Level	Professor Stephen Turner	Television film	
1976; 1994	Columbo	Ward Fowler / Fielding Chase	Episode: "Fade in to Murder" and "Butterfly in Shades of Grey"	
1977	The Oregon Trail	Master Sgt. Buford Cole	Episode: "The Scarlet Ribbon"	
1977	Testimony of Two Men	Adrian Ferrier	Television miniseries	
1977	Mysteries of the Gods	Narrator	Documentary	
1978	How the West Was Won	Captain Harrison	Miniseries	
1978	Little Women	Professor Friedrich Bhaer	Episode: "Part II"	
1978	The Bastard	Paul Revere	Television film	
1978	Crash	Carl Tobias	Television film	
1979	Riel	The Barker	Television film	
1979	Disaster on the Coastliner	Stuart Peters	Television film	
1980	The Babysitter	Dr. Jeff Benedict	Television film	
1982	Police Squad!	Poisoned Man	Episode: "Revenge and Remorse (The Guilty Alibi)"	
1982	Madame's Place	Self	Episode: "No Fun Without Practice"	
1982	The Vegetarian World	Himself: host & narrator	Documentary	
1982–1986	T. J. Hooker	Sergeant Thomas Jefferson "T. J." Hooker	Main role; 5 seasons	
1984	Secrets of a Married Man	Chris Jordan	Television film	
1985	The Ray Bradbury Theater	Charles Underhill	Episode: "The Playground"	
1986	Saturday Night Live	Himself/Host	Episode: "William Shatner/Lone Justice"	
1987	The Search for Houdini	Host	Live TV Special	
1988	Broken Angel	Chuck Coburn	Television film	
1989–1996	Rescue 911	Host	7 seasons & 2 specials	
1992	The Larry Sanders Show	Himself	Episode: "The Promise"	
1993	A Celebration of Horses: The American Saddlebred	Himself	Television special	
1993	Family of Strangers	Earl	Television film	
1993	SeaQuest DSV	President Milos Teslo	Episode: "Hide and Seek"	
1994–1996	TekWar	Walter H. Bascom	18 episodes	
1995, 2010	WWE Raw	Himself	Celebrity guest appearance for three episodes; two in 1995 and one in 2010.	
1996	The Fresh Prince of Bel-Air	Himself	Episode: "Eye, Tooth"	
1996	Star Trek: Deep Space Nine	Captain James T. Kirk	Archive footage used in episode: "Trials and Tribble-ations"	
1996	The Prisoner of Zenda, Inc.	Michael Gatewick	Television film	
1996	Dead Man's Island	Chase Prescott	Television film	
1998	A Twist in the Tale	The Storyteller / Narrator	15 episodes	
1998	Hercules	Jason of the Argonauts	Voice; Episode: "Hercules and the Argonauts"	
1999–2000	3rd Rock from the Sun	The Big Giant Head	5 episodes	
2002	Futurama	Himself	Voice; Episode: "Where No Fan Has Gone Before"	
2003	Chilly Beach	The President	Voice; Episode: Dale to the Chief	
2003	A Carol Christmas	Dr. Bob / Ghost of Christmas Present	2 episodes	
2003	Space Ghost Coast to Coast	Himself	Episode: "In Memory of Elizabeth Reed"	
2004	The Practice	Denny Crane	Recurring role, 5 episodes in season 8	
2004–2008	Boston Legal	Denny Crane	Main role; 5 seasons	
2005	Atomic Betty	Jim Barrett	2 episodes	
2005	Invasion Iowa	Star	10 episodes	
2005	Star Trek: Enterprise	James T. Kirk	Voice; Archive audio used in episode: "These Are the Voyages..."	
2005	How William Shatner Changed the World	Host	Television film	
2006	Show Me the Money	Host	7 episodes	
2006	Comedy Central Roast of William Shatner	Roastee	Television special	
2007	Everest '82	Norman Kelly	Miniseries	
2007	Fire Serpent	Creator and co-executive producer	Television film	
2007	Mars Rising	Narrator	12 episodes	
2007; 2021	WWE Hall of Fame	Himself	2007: Inducted Jerry Lawler. 2021: Class of 2020 inductee.	
2008–2011	Shatner's Raw Nerve	Host	39 episodes	
2010–2011	$#*! My Dad Says	Dr. Edison "Ed" Milford Goodson	18 episodes	
2010–2011	Aftermath with William Shatner	Host	12 episodes	
2010–2012	Weird or What?	Host	30 episodes	
2011–2012	Psych	Frank O'Hara	2 episodes	
2011	American Pickers	Himself	Episode: "They Boldly Go"	
2011	Comedy Central Roast of Charlie Sheen	Roaster	Television special	
2012	Rookie Blue	Henry McLeod	Episode: "The First Day of the Rest of Your Life"	
2012	Have I Got News for You	Host	1 episode	
2013	Hot in Cleveland	Sally	Episode: "It's Alive"	
2013	85th Academy Awards	James T. Kirk	Television special	
2013	Kelly Clarkson's Cautionary Christmas Music Tale	NBC Television Executive	Television special	
2013	The Captains Close Up	Host/James T. Kirk	Documentary; Also actor, interviewer, and director	
2014	The Shatner Project	Himself	6 episodes	
2014	Chaos on the Bridge	Interviewer	Documentary; Also writer and director	
2015	WWE Breaking Ground	Narrator	WWE Network documentary; 10 episodes	
2015	Murdoch Mysteries	Mark Twain	Episode: "Marked Twain"	
2015	Haven	Croatoan	4 episodes	
2015–present	Clangers	Narrator	Voice; English dub	
2016	Cutthroat Kitchen	Himself	Episode: "The One With William Shatner"	
2016–2018	Better Late Than Never	Himself	12 episodes	
2017	My Little Pony: Friendship Is Magic	Grand Pear	Voice, episode: "The Perfect Pear"	
2017, 2019	Private Eyes	Norm Glinski	2 episodes	
2017	The Indian Detective	David Marlowe	4 episodes	
2019	The Big Bang Theory	Himself	Episode: "The D&D Vortex"	
2019	Star Trek: Short Treks	James T. Kirk	Voice; Archive audio used in episode: "Ephraim and Dot"	
2019–present	The UnXplained	Host		
2021	WWE PPV	William Shatner	Episode: "WrestleMania 37"	
2021	My Life Is Murder	Barton Wallwork	Episode: "Sleep No More"	
2021	I Don't Understand with William Shatner	William Shatner		
2021	Shatner in Space	Himself	Made-for-TV documentary (Amazon)	
2022	The Masked Singer	Knight	Eliminated in first episode	
2023	Stars on Mars	Himself	Presenter	
2024	Masters of the Universe: Revolution	King Keldor / Skeletor	Voice; Main role	
TBA	The Elevator	Ben	Completed	

== Video games ==
Year	Title	Voice role	Notes
1994	Star Trek: 25th Anniversary	James T. Kirk	
1995	Star Trek: Judgment Rites	James T. Kirk	
1995	Star Trek: Starfleet Academy	James T. Kirk	
1995	William Shatner's Tekwar	Walter Bascom	
1997	Star Trek Generations	James T. Kirk	
2006	Star Trek: Legacy	James T. Kirk	
2006	Star Trek: Encounters	James T. Kirk	Narrator
2006	Star Trek: Tactical Assault	James T. Kirk	
2007	The Tuttles Madcap Misadventures	Vance Shepherd	

== Commercials ==
Year	Title	Role	Ref(s)
1970s	Promise Margarine	Spokesman	
1973	Loblaws	Himself	
1980s	Commodore Computers	VIC-20 spokesman	
1985	Western Airlines	Himself	
1990	National Power and PowerGen	Captain Kirk	
1997–present	Priceline.com	Chief Negotiating Officer	
2006	DirecTV	Captain Kirk	
2007	World of Warcraft	Himself	
2007–present	Hupy and Abraham Law Firm	Himself	
2013	Star Trek video game commercial	Himself	
2014	Volkswagen	Himself	
2026	Raisin Bran Will Shat Super Bowl commercial	Will Shat - Bran Ambassador	

== Discography ==
- The Transformed Man (1968) – Decca Records
- Isaac Asimov – Foundation: the Psychohistorians (1975) – Caedmon Records
- William Shatner Live (1977) – live double album – Lemli Records (reissued the following year by Imperial House as Captain of the Starship – William Shatner Live!)
- Science Fiction Soundbook with Leonard Nimoy (1977) – Caedmon Records
- Spaced Out: The Very Best of Leonard Nimoy & William Shatner (1996) – compilation album – Universal (Includes 7 tracks from The Transformed Man + 17 tracks by Leonard Nimoy)
- Has Been (2004) – produced and arranged by Ben Folds – guest artists include Folds, Joe Jackson, Aimee Mann, Lemon Jelly, Henry Rollins, Adrian Belew, and Brad Paisley – Shout! Factory
- Exodus: An Oratorio in Three Parts (2008) – JMG/Jewish Music
- Seeking Major Tom (2011) – Cleopatra Records
- Ponder the Mystery (2013) with Billy Sherwood – Cleopatra Records
- Why Not Me (2018) with Jeff Cook – Heartland Records Nashville
- Shatner Claus (2018) – with Iggy Pop, Brad Paisley and Judy Collins – Cleopatra Records
- The Blues (2020) – with Brad Paisley, Kirk Fletcher, Sonny Landreth, Canned Heat – Cleopatra Records
- Bill (2021) – Produced and arranged by Daniel Miller. – guest artists include Brad Paisley, Joe Walsh, Robert Randolph, John Lurie, Joan As Police Woman and Dave Koz - Republic Records.
- So Fragile, So Blue (2024) – with Ben Folds, National Symphony Orchestra, and Steven Reineke at the Kennedy Center
- Where Will the Animals Sleep? Songs for Kids & Other Living Things (2024) – Cleopatra Records

== See also ==
- William Shatner's musical career
- List of awards and nominations received by William Shatner
