= Major Tom =

David Bowie character

- David Bowie as Major Tom in the "Space Oddity" video, part of the 1969 promotional film Love You Till Tuesday
- First appearance: "Space Oddity"
- Created by: David Bowie

In-universe information
- Occupation: Astronaut

Major Tom is a character created by David Bowie, referenced in songs including "Space Oddity", "Ashes to Ashes", "Hallo Spaceboy", and "Blackstar". Bowie's own interpretation of the character evolved throughout his career. "Space Oddity" (1969) depicts an astronaut who casually slips the bonds of the world to journey beyond the stars. In the song "Ashes to Ashes" (1980), Bowie reinterprets Major Tom as an oblique autobiographical symbol for himself. Major Tom is described as a "junkie, strung out in heaven's high, hitting an all-time low". This lyric was interpreted as a play on the title of Bowie's album Low (1977), which was inspired by the withdrawal symptoms he suffered while undergoing treatment for drug addiction. Additionally, the choked and self-recriminating tone used in the lyrics "Time and again I tell myself I'll stay clean tonight" reinforces an autobiographical and retrospective interpretation. A short time later, there is another reversal of Major Tom's original withdrawal, turning 'outwards' or towards space.

German singer Peter Schilling retold and continued the story of Major Tom in his late 1982 release "Major Tom (völlig losgelöst)", which reached number one in Germany and Austria in early 1983. The English-language version, "Major Tom (Coming Home)", peaked at number 14 in the United States in late 1983. Other artists who have subsequently made substantial contributions to the Major Tom story include K.I.A. ("Mrs. Major Tom") and The Tea Party ("Empty Glass"). Due to some similarities in Elton John's "Rocket Man", there is a possible connection between the Rocket Man and Major Tom, a connection notably made by Bowie himself, who while singing "Space Oddity" in concert would sometimes call out, "Oh, Rocket Man!"

== Major Tom in Bowie's work ==
In "Space Oddity", from the album David Bowie (1969, later retitled Space Oddity), Major Tom's departure from Earth is successful and everything goes according to plan. He's asked to venture outside of his "capsule, if [he] dares", which he does and begins "floating in a most peculiar way." At a certain point during the travel ('past one hundred thousand miles'), he claims that "he feels very still" and thinks that "my spaceship knows which way to go" and proceeds to say: "Tell my wife I love her very much." Control then informs him: "Ground Control to Major Tom: your circuit's dead, there's something wrong" and attempts to reestablish contact with Major Tom. Tom's final words in the song (possibly not heard by Ground Control) are:

"Here am I floating 'round my tin can, far above the moon. Planet Earth is blue, and there's nothing I can do."

In the promotional film from 1969, David Bowie plays as Major Tom, Ground Control (GC), and the Countdown Announcer. When the lyrics "And the stars look very different today" are said, two women appear, portraying either angels or aliens, or perhaps both. The moment "Though I'm past one hundred thousand miles, I'm feeling very still" are said, the two women can be seen removing Major Tom's helmet and spacesuit. Later, a still fully outfitted Major Tom can be seen spinning around in space, with a panicked Ground Control attempting to contact him; the spinning Major Tom is either the reality of the situation, or Ground Control's imagination. The music video ends with Major Tom sitting in his "tin can", far above the world, with the two women by him in a ménage à trois formation.

Bowie created a sequel entitled "Ashes to Ashes" (1980). The song, which peaked at Number 1 in the UK music charts and had a respectable showing in other international music charts, was featured on his LP Scary Monsters (And Super Creeps). The song actually says little about Major Tom, except to call him a "junkie"; The context of the lyrics seems to indicate that the song is mainly about Bowie's own experiences with drug addiction, rather than a literal continuation of the Major Tom story.

Alternatively, the song can be interpreted to provide detailed information on Tom's story. The song refers an event happening much later, after "Space Oddity". Ground control receives a message from the "Action Man", referring to Tom, and he says: "I've loved all I've needed to love. Sordid details following..." He talks about how the shrieking of nothing is killing him, how all he has are his pictures of women to keep him company, and how he now has neither money nor hair. He wants to stop, but the planet is "glowing"; essentially he cannot quit whatever is influencing him—and killing him—because the feeling is too pleasurable and addictive. The exact source of the influence is not defined. The later verses seem to reflect more on Bowie's literal battle with addiction, specifically about wanting to stay clean but being stuck with a "valuable friend". The song again refers directly to Tom toward the end, where he has become more of a legend, but not for his heroics. He has become a nursery rhyme in the minds of the public, with mothers warning against drug use by telling their children if they want: "...to get things done, you'd better not mess with Major Tom."

Bowie released a song entitled "Hallo Spaceboy" on his album Outside (1995). While this song itself does not directly reference Major Tom, references to Major Tom do appear in the remixed version that Bowie released with the Pet Shop Boys in 1996. This remix contains lyrics from "Space Oddity" that are sung by Pet Shop Boys vocalist Neil Tennant.

Although never mentioned in the song, an astronaut, possibly Major Tom, does make an appearance in the music video for the song "Slow Burn" on Bowie's 2002 album Heathen. The same album also contains a cover of Legendary Stardust Cowboy's I Took a Trip on a Gemini Spaceship, again hinting a metaphoric connection between space journeys and drug use.

In the music video of Bowie's 2015 song "Blackstar" (on the album of the same name, released in 2016 two days prior to his death), a dead astronaut is depicted. His jewel-encrusted skull is retrieved by an alien female who takes it back to what could be considered a cult which subsequently worships the relic. This astronaut was speculated to be a depiction of Major Tom's final fate. Video director Johan Renck said on a BBC documentary "to me, it was 100% Major Tom".

== In popular culture ==
Major Tom is the basis for a character of the same name on the TV show Venture Brothers, who is a former member of the original Team Venture. Lyrics from “Space Oddity” and “Ashes to Ashes” are quoted verbatim in the sixth episode of Season 1, “Ghosts of the Sargasso.”
