= Seeking Major Tom =

Studio album by William Shatner
- Released: October 11, 2011
- Recorded: 2011
- Genres: Rock, spoken word
- Length: 95:13
- Label: Cleopatra Records
- Producer: Adam Hamilton

William Shatner chronology
| Exodus: An Oratorio in Three Parts (2008) | Seeking Major Tom (2011) | Ponder the Mystery (2013) |

Seeking Major Tom is the fourth studio album by William Shatner. It was released October 11, 2011 in the US by Cleopatra Records.

== Production ==
The album features many noted musicians, including Patrick Kennison, Sheryl Crow, John Wetton, Patrick Moraz, Ritchie Blackmore, Alan Parsons, Peter Frampton, Warren Haynes, Nick Valensi, Zakk Wylde, Mike Inez, Chris Adler, Steve Hillage, Steve Howe, Michael Schenker, Dave Davies, Johnny Winter, Brad Paisley, Bootsy Collins, Wayne Kramer, Carmine Appice, Ian Paice, and Toots Hibbert. The titular Major Tom was created by David Bowie.

In July 2020, Howe told Rolling Stone when asked about performing on "Planet Earth":

Get lost! Absolutely get lost! And you can print that! I played some really good things on that and they aren’t on the recording. There is none of me there at all. There is some guy playing what everybody else could have played. I said, "Look, I’m not going to play the part that everybody knows is part of that song. That’s easy. You can’t make anything of it." And so I did some single-line stuff. God knows what happened. But when the record came out, I put it on and there was none of me on there at all. As much as I think that William Shatner is fun and all that — I know he’s a good friend of [Yes bassist] Billy Sherwood — but that is rude. To credit me and not have me on there is just about the nastiest you can do. It’s not a good thing to do.

== Release ==
Shatner released a music video for his version of "Bohemian Rhapsody". The New Zealand Herald labeled the video as "typically bizarre".

== Reception ==
Professional ratings
Review scores
| Source | Rating |
|---|---|
| AllMusic | 3.5/5 stars |
| Consequence of Sound | 3/5 stars |
| The Tune | (3.8/5) |

The album debuted at number 1 on the Billboard Heatseekers chart in America and number 147 on the Canadian Albums Chart.

== Track listing ==
Most tracks on the album are covers of space-themed songs.

1. "Major Tom (Coming Home)" (Peter Schilling)
2. "Space Oddity" (David Bowie)
3. "In a Little While" (Bono, Adam Clayton, The Edge, Larry Mullen Jr.)
4. "Space Cowboy" (Steve Miller, Ben Sidran)
5. "Space Truckin'" (Ritchie Blackmore, Ian Gillan, Roger Glover, Jon Lord, Ian Paice)
6. "Rocket Man" (Elton John, Bernie Taupin) (previously performed by Shatner in 1978)
7. "She Blinded Me with Science" (Thomas Dolby, Jo Kerr)
8. "Walking on the Moon" (Sting)
9. "Spirit in the Sky" (Norman Greenbaum)
10. "Bohemian Rhapsody" (Freddie Mercury)
11. "Silver Machine" (Robert Calvert, Dave Brock)
12. "Mrs. Major Tom" (Kirby Ian Andersen, Sheryl Crow)
13. "Empty Glass" (The Tea Party)
14. "Lost in the Stars" (Kurt Weill, Maxwell Anderson)
15. "Learning to Fly" (David Gilmour, Anthony Moore, Bob Ezrin, Jon Carin)
16. "Mr. Spaceman" (Roger McGuinn)
17. "Twilight Zone" (George Kooymans)
18. "Struggle" (William Shatner, Adam Hamilton)
19. "Iron Man" (Tony Iommi, Ozzy Osbourne, Geezer Butler, Bill Ward)
20. "Planet Earth" (Simon Le Bon, Nick Rhodes, John Taylor, Roger Taylor, Andy Taylor)
