= Kirby Ian Andersen =

Canadian electronic musician

- Also known as: Shinjuku Zulu, K.I.A.
- Born: Calgary, Alberta, Canada
- Origin: Toronto, Ontario, Canada
- Genres: electronica
- Label: Neuphoria Recordings

Kirby Ian Andersen is a visual artist and musician from Toronto, Ontario, Canada. He does painting, sculpture, and installation work under the name K.I.A. He records music under the name Shinjuku Zulu as well as K.I.A.

Andersen's art shows have been reviewed by RM Vaughan in The Globe and Mail, and Peter Goddard in the Toronto Star. He has exhibited in Canada, Japan, and the United States.

The Shinjuku Zulu album received four-star reviews from the music reviewers for The Globe and Mail (Robert Everett-Green) and Montreal Gazette (T'Cha Dunlevy). The song "Mrs. Major Tom", first released on the K.I.A. album "Adieu Shinjuku Zulu", was covered by Sheryl Crow on the album "Seeking Major Tom" by William Shatner. Songs by Shinjuku Zulu and K.I.A. have appeared in American films and television programmes such as Resurrecting the Champ, America's Next Top Model, and Paris Hilton's My New BFF among others.

== Discography ==
=== K.I.A. ===
- Sonorous Susurrus (2004), includes single "Nevermine"
- Adieu Shinjuku Zulu (2003), includes single "Mrs. Major Tom"

=== Shinjuku Zulu ===
- Kiss the Honey, Honey (2007), includes singles "SXYLV", "Kiss the Honey, Honey"
- Various Chimeras (2006), includes singles "Scarborough Fair (A True Dub of Mine)", "Make Me Shake (Gimme Some Crush)"
- Shinjuku Zulu (2000), includes single "That Groove"

=== Compilation ===
- Xenophile Wildstyle - World 'Best Of' K.I.A. & Shinjuku Zulu (2016), includes "Segue" (Shinjuku Zulu), "Eyeah" (K.I.A.)
- F-1 Papillons - 'Best Of' K.I.A. & Shinjuku Zulu (2009), includes singles "Baby U Got" and "Make Me Shake"
- DXLR8 - Downtempo 'Best Of' K.I.A. & Shinjuku Zulu (2008), includes singles "Allelujah" (K.I.A.), "Coal Coal Black" (Shinjuku Zulu)
