= Shatner's Raw Nerve =

Television series

- Starring: William Shatner
- Country of origin: United States

Production
- Camera setup: Multi-camera
- Running time: 30 minutes

Original release
- Network: The Biography Channel
- Release: December 2, 2008 – March 14, 2011

Shatner's Raw Nerve was an American television program on The Biography Channel. In it, William Shatner conducted offbeat interviews with various celebrities. Guests included Tim Allen, Jon Voight, Drew Carey, Kelsey Grammer, Walter Koenig, LeVar Burton, Scott Bakula, Jimmy Kimmel, Rush Limbaugh, Judge Judy Sheindlin, "Weird Al" Yankovic, Jenna Jameson, and Leonard Nimoy (one of his last interviews). It was produced by Scott Sternberg Productions.

== Reactions from Star Trek cast members ==
During the interview with Walter Koenig, Shatner could tell that Koenig was withholding something about how he viewed Shatner. After Shatner persuaded him to continue, Koenig revealed that there had been a feeling on the set of Star Trek that Shatner could get any of them fired, though he never saw Shatner actually follow through on that perceived feeling. Koenig also informed Shatner that while his and other actors' roles may not have been as prominent as Shatner's, Leonard Nimoy's or DeForest Kelley's, there were still contributions they could have made to each scene if Shatner had allowed them to do so. As Koenig put it, they wanted to say to him, "Cut the shit, Shatner", but did not.

Similar to his experience when conducting interviews for Star Trek Memories, Shatner was surprised by this and was remorseful, saying that he would have behaved differently if he had known. He then offered to find a role for Koenig on his then current series ($#*! My Dad Says) since he had "a little more authority" than he did on Star Trek, but the series was cancelled before he could fulfill that offer.
