= Star Trek Memories =

1993 William Shatner autobiography

- First hardcover edition, 1993
- Author: William Shatner
- Language: English
- Subject: Autobiography
- Genre: Non-fiction
- Publisher: Harper-Collins
- Publication date: November 1993
- Publication place: United States
- Followed by: Star Trek Movie Memories

Star Trek Memories is the first of two volumes of autobiography dictated by William Shatner and transcribed by MTV editorial director Christopher Kreski. In the book, published in 1993, Shatner interviews several cast members of Star Trek: The Original Series and was surprised by the reaction of his fellow actors, who spoke negatively of their experiences with him on the show. James Doohan refused to be involved.

== Contents ==
The book begins at the start of production on Star Trek: The Original Series, with the work on the original pilot, "The Cage", and described the difficulties that some of the producers' decisions caused the production. Shatner goes on to describe the production of the show, and the aftermath of its cancellation. He interviews other members of the cast who on occasion speak negatively of their experiences on the show and also spoke to Bjo Trimble, one of the most famous Star Trek fans. James Doohan, who played Scotty on the series, refused to be involved in the project - he later accused Shatner of hogging the camera, adding: "I like Captain Kirk, but I sure don't like Bill. He's so insecure that all he can think about is himself."

== Production ==
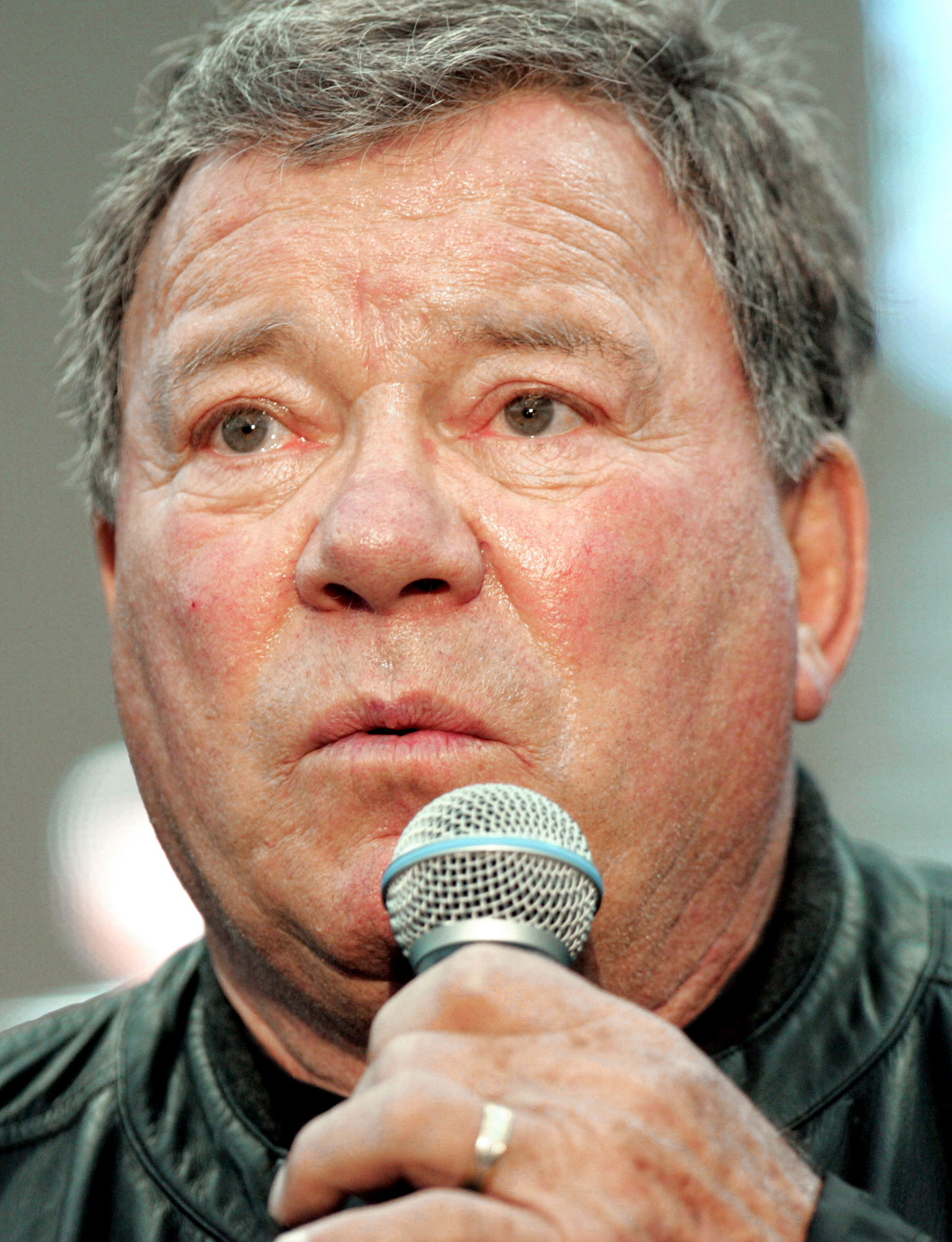
William Shatner in 2014

The negative reaction of some of the cast members to him when he wrote Star Trek Memories had come as a surprise to Shatner, and it was reported at the time that he was dismayed at the response. He conducted the interviews by phone in some cases, including the one with Trimble. One of the stories included in the book, which involved Shatner putting out a fire on the Paramount lot, was directly contradicted by George Takei in his autobiography To the Stars: The Autobiography of George Takei. Instead, Takei said that when the fire broke out, Shatner was driven by public relations executives to the site of the fire and posed with a hose for photographs. However, while Star Trek Memories contains a description of an incident while filming "The Naked Time" that Shatner described as Takei getting carried away with an épée and nearly disembowelling him – Takei's book instead makes no mention of it.

Preview excerpts of the book were published in the September 4 issue of TV Guide magazine in the United States. It was published in the autumn of 1993, followed in 1994 with Star Trek Movie Memories. He worked on both books with Christopher Kreski, with whom he later worked on the 1999 book Get a Life!. Star Trek Memories was converted into a video documentary featuring interviews with other Star Trek cast members in 1996.

== Reviews ==
The review in trade magazine Publishers Weekly, said that "Fans of TV's 1960s science fiction series Star Trek will go into orbit over lead player Shatner's candid, captivating reminiscence, packed with stellar anecdotes and backstage lore." The Post-Tribune said that both Memories books by Shatner "were very well done and filled with interesting stories and insights into Shatner's thoughts" in a review of his later book, Get A Life!, while the Winnipeg Free Press described Star Trek Memories as a "masterpiece".
