= List of awards and nominations received by William Shatner =

William Shatners awards and nominations
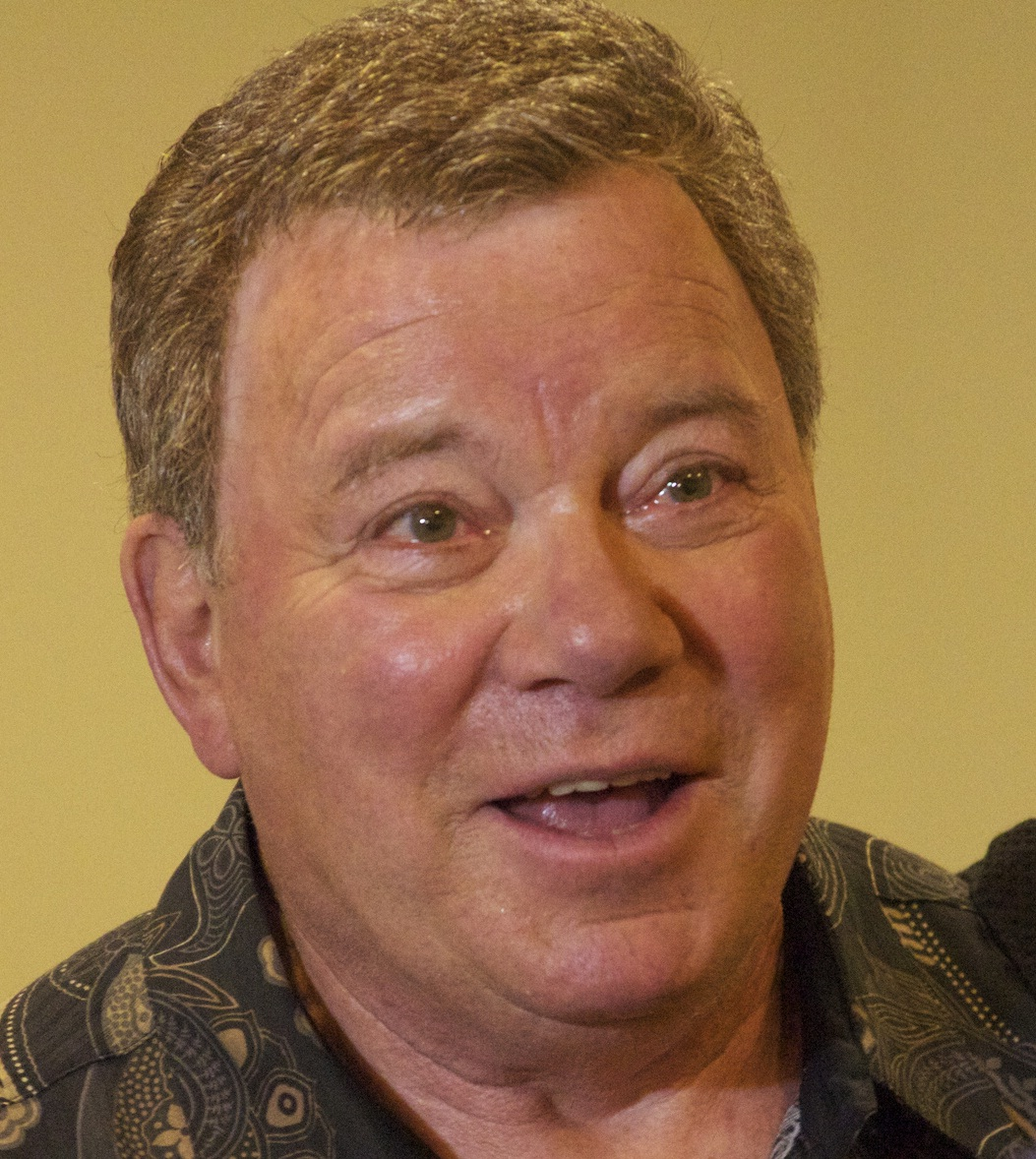
- Shatner at the 2012 San Diego Comic-Con
Awards and nominations
Award	Wins	Nominations
Golden Globe	1	2
Emmy Awards	2	8
Screen Actors Guild Awards	0	6

The following is a list of awards and nominations received by William Shatner.

Shatner has earned numerous accolades including two Primetime Emmy Awards, a Golden Globe Award, and four Saturn Awards. Shatner won his first Emmy Award for Outstanding Guest Actor in a Drama Series for his role as Denny Crane on the David E. Kelley ABC series The Practice (2004). The following year he won the Primetime Emmy Award for Outstanding Supporting Actor in a Drama Series and the Golden Globe Award for Best Supporting Actor – Series, Miniseries or Television Film for the same role this time on ABC series Boston Legal (2005).

Shatner has earned six Saturn Awards acting nominations: the first for Kingdom of the Spiders, four others for the first four Star Trek films, and one as a recurring guest star on Haven. He won the Best Actor award for Star Trek II: The Wrath of Khan, Best Guest Actor for Haven, and earned The Life Career Award in 1980 jointly with Gene Roddenberry. In 2025, he was awarded the Saturns' Lifetime Achievement Award.

In 2011, he was given made an honorary Doctor of Letters by McGill University, his alma mater. In 2019, he was named an Officer of the Order of Canada.

== Major associations ==
=== Emmy Awards ===
Year	Category	Nominated work	Result	Ref.
Primetime Emmy Award
1999	Outstanding Guest Actor in a Comedy Series	3rd Rock from the Sun: Dick's Big Giant Headache	Nominated	
2004	Outstanding Guest Actor in a Drama Series	The Practice: Season 8	Won	
2005	Outstanding Supporting Actor in a Drama Series	Boston Legal	Won	
2006	Outstanding Supporting Actor in a Drama Series	Boston Legal	Nominated	
2007	Outstanding Supporting Actor in a Drama Series	Boston Legal	Nominated	
2008	Outstanding Supporting Actor in a Drama Series	Boston Legal	Nominated	
2009	Outstanding Supporting Actor in a Drama Series	Boston Legal	Nominated	
Children's and Family Emmy Award
2024	Outstanding Voice Performer in an Animated Program	Masters of the Universe: Revolution	Nominated	

=== Golden Globe Awards ===
Year	Category	Nominated work	Result	Ref.
2005	Best Supporting Actor – Television	Boston Legal	Won	
2008	Best Supporting Actor – Television	Boston Legal	Nominated	

=== Grammy Awards ===
Year	Category	Nominated work	Result	Ref.
2023	Best Audio Book, Narration & Storytelling Recording	Boldly Go: Reflections on a Life of Awe and Wonder	Nominated	

=== Screen Actors Guild Awards ===
Year	Category	Nominated work	Result	Ref.
2006	Outstanding Male Actor in a Comedy Series	Boston Legal	Nominated	
2006	Outstanding Ensemble in a Comedy Series	Boston Legal	Nominated	
2007	Outstanding Ensemble in a Comedy Series	Boston Legal	Nominated	
2008	Outstanding Ensemble in a Comedy Series	Boston Legal	Nominated	
2009	Outstanding Male Actor in a Drama Series	Boston Legal	Nominated	
2009	Outstanding Ensemble in a Drama Series	Boston Legal	Nominated	

== Miscellaneous awards ==
Year	Award	Category	Series/Film	Result	Ref.
1958	Theatre World Award		The World of Suzie Wong	Awarded	
1978	Saturn Awards	Best Actor	Kingdom of the Spiders	Nominated	
1980	Saturn Awards	Best Actor	Star Trek: The Motion Picture	Nominated	
1980	Saturn Awards	Life Career Award (Note: Jointly awarded alongside Gene Roddenberry.)		Won	
1983	Saturn Awards	Best Actor	Star Trek II: The Wrath of Khan	Won	
1985	American Saddlebred Horse Association	Meritorious Service Award		Won	
1985	Saturn Awards	Best Actor	Star Trek III: The Search for Spock	Nominated	
1987	Saturn Awards	Best Actor	Star Trek IV: The Voyage Home	Nominated	
1989	Golden Raspberry Awards	Worst Actor	Star Trek V: The Final Frontier	Won	
1989	Golden Raspberry Awards	Worst Director	Star Trek V: The Final Frontier	Won	
1989	Golden Raspberry Awards	Worst Screenplay	Star Trek V: The Final Frontier	Nominated	
1995	Golden Raspberry Awards	Worst Supporting Actor	Star Trek Generations	Nominated	
1996	American Saddlebred Horse Association	Breeders Hall of Fame Award		Won	
2000	Golden Raspberry Awards	Worst Actor of the Century		Nominated	
2000	Teen Choice Awards	Choice TV Personality		Nominated	
2001	Canadian Comedy Awards	Funniest Male Performance in a Film	Miss Congeniality	Nominated	
2001	Annie Awards	Best Male Voice Acting in an Animated Feature	Osmosis Jones	Nominated	
2005	Satellite Awards	Best Supporting Actor – Television	Boston Legal	Nominated	
2009	Marbella International Film Festival	Best Documentary Film	William Shatner's Gonzo Ballet	Won	
2009	Prism Awards	Best Performance in a Drama Episode	Boston Legal	Won	
2009	Rhode Island International Film Festival	Nathanael Greene Humanitarian Award		Awarded	
2009	Streamy Awards	Best Reality Web Series	The Shatner Project	Won	
2009	Streamy Awards	Best Web Series	The Shatner Project	Nominated	
2011	American Saddlebred Horse Association	C. J. Cronan Sportsmanship Award		Won	
2011	Governor General's Awards	Performing Arts Awards		Awarded	
2011	Revolver Golden Gods Awards	Honorary Headbanger Award		Won	
2011	Television Critics Association Awards	Career Achievement Award		Nominated	
2012	Audie Awards	Best Humour	Shatner's Rules	Won	
2012	Television Critics Association Awards	Career Achievement Award		Nominated	
2013	Stratford Festival	Legacy Award		Awarded	
2013	Television Critics Association Awards	Career Achievement Award		Nominated	
2014	NASA	Distinguished Public Service Medal		Awarded	
2015	Canadian Screen Awards	Documentary Program or Series	Chaos on the Bridge	Nominated	
2015	Saturn Awards	Best Guest Star on Television	Haven	Won	
2015	Taste Awards	Lifetime Achievement Award		Awarded	
2015	Voice Arts Awards	Icon Award		Awarded	
2016	Taste Awards	Best Branded Programme	Brown Bag Wine Tasting with William Shatner	Nominated	
2016	Taste Awards	Best Branded Video Promotion or Campaign	Brown Bag Wine Tasting with William Shatner	Nominated	
2016	Taste Awards	Best Drink or Beverage Programme: Web	Brown Bag Wine Tasting with William Shatner	Nominated	
2016	Taste Awards	Best Entertainment News Series – Online	Brown Bag Wine Tasting with William Shatner	Nominated	
2016	Taste Awards	Best Reality Series: Food or Drink	Brown Bag Wine Tasting with William Shatner	Nominated	
2017	Canadian Screen Awards	Best Guest Role Dramatic Series	Murdoch Mysteries	Nominated	
2020	WWE Hall of Fame	Celebrity inductee		Awarded	
2024	Visual Effects Society Awards	VES Award for Creative Excellence		Awarded	
2025	Saturn Awards	Lifetime Achievement Award		Awarded	

== Equestrian awards ==
- Multiple time World Champion breeder
- 1985 American Saddlebred Horse Association (ASHA) Meritorious Service Award
- 2017 National Reining Horse Association Dale Wilkinson Lifetime Achievement Award
- 2021 ASHA C.J Cronan Sportsmanship Award

== National awards ==
- 2011 Governor General's Performing Arts Award
- 2019 Appointed an Officer of the Order of Canada by Canadian Governor General Julie Payette

== Organizational ==
- 2014 NASA Distinguished Public Service Medal – highest award NASA gives a non-government employee

== Halls of Fame ==
- 1983 Star on the Hollywood Walk of Fame
- 1995 ASHA Breeders Hall of Fame
- 2000 Star on Canada's Walk of Fame
- 2006 Television Hall of Fame
- 2020 WWE Hall of Fame – Celebrity Wing inductee

== Honorary Degrees ==
- 2011 Honorary Doctorate of Letters from McGill University
