= Taste Awards =

American awards for lifestyle media

- Awarded for: Works in food, fashion, health, travel and lifestyle media
- Sponsored by: TasteTV
- Date: January 14, 2010; 16 years ago
- Venue: Writers Guild Theater
- Country: United States
- Presented by: Academy of Media Tastemakers
- Formerly called: Tasty Awards
- Status: active
- First award: 2010
- Website: www.thetasteawards.com

Television/radio coverage
- Network: Hulu, PBS

The Taste Awards are annual American awards honoring food, fashion, health, travel and lifestyle work in film, television, online video, radio, podcasts and photography.

The inaugural ceremony, called the Tasty Awards, was held on January 14, 2010 at the Sundance Cinemas in San Francisco, and was hosted by television personality Zane Lamprey.

The awards initially included television programs and independently produced online video. The first food categories featured several web-based productions, and the nominees included national television programs, local productions and independent online series.

The honorees for the inaugural awards were chosen through audience votes and expert panels, and included businessman Gary Vaynerchuk, the web series The Naked Wine Show, and the culinary series Average Betty.

The 14th annual Taste Awards were held on March 13, 2023 at the Writers Guild Theater in Beverly Hills. The awards featured 50 categories and media formats, and the category for comedy was renamed to honor comedian Bob Saget. The ceremony was also distributed through PBS.
