= Up Till Now =

Up Till Now: The Autobiography
- First edition
- Author: William Shatner with David Fisher
- Language: English
- Genre: Autobiography
- Publisher: Thomas Dunne Books
- Publication date: 2008
- Publication place: United States
- Media type: Hardcover, paperback
- Pages: 368
- ISBN: 0-312-37265-5
- OCLC: 192045752
- Dewey Decimal: 791.4502/8092 B 22
- LC Class: PN2308.S52 A3 2008

Up Till Now: The Autobiography is a 2008 autobiography by actor William Shatner with David Fisher. In the book Shatner discusses several aspects of his life including his childhood, early career struggles, time starring on Star Trek, his career after Star Trek and his marriages.

== References in pop culture ==
Excerpts from the book were read by Sarah Palin on the December 11, 2009 episode of The Tonight Show with Conan O'Brien after Shatner had read excerpts from Palin's memoir, Going Rogue: An American Life.
