= Ponder the Mystery =

Studio album by William Shatner
- Released: October 7, 2013
- Recorded: 2013
- Genre: Rock, spoken word
- Label: Cleopatra
- Producer: Billy Sherwood

William Shatner chronology
Seeking Major Tom (2011)	Ponder the Mystery (2013)	Why Not Me (2018)

Ponder the Mystery is the fifth studio album by William Shatner. It was released on October 8, 2013 in the US by Cleopatra Records. The album was produced and mixed by Billy Sherwood, who also composed the music and performs vocals, drums, bass, guitars and keys, while many noted musicians also guest, including Tony Kaye. The album was mastered by mastering engineer Maor Appelbaum.

== Track listing ==
1. "Red Shift"
2. "Where It's Gone... I Don't Know", with Mick Jones
3. "Manhunt", with Simon House
4. "Ponder the Mystery", with Steve Vai
5. "So Am I", with Al Di Meola
6. "Change", with Rick Wakeman
7. "Sunset", with Joel Vandroogenbroeck
8. "Twilight", with Edgar Winter
9. "Rhythm of the Night", with Nik Turner
10. "Imagine Things", with Vince Gill
11. "Do You See?", with Edgar Froese
12. "Deep Down", with Robby Krieger
13. "I'm Alright, I Think", with Dave Koz
14. "Where Does Time Go?", with George Duke
15. "Alive", with Zoot Horn Rollo
