= The Naked Wine Show =

Web series

- Genre: wine education, wine criticism
- Directed by: Matt Campagna
- Starring: Susan Sterling
- Country of origin: Canada
- Original language: English

Production
- Executive producer: Timothy Troke
- Producer: Anastasia 'Nat' Tubanos
- Production company: Frogwater Media

Original release
- Release: August 12, 2008 – present

The Naked Wine Show is a wine review web series hosted by Susan Sterling, developed by Timothy Troke, produced by Anastasia 'Nat' Tubanos and directed by film director Matt Campagna under the production company Frogwater Media. The show features fast-paced critiques to deliver information such as tasting notes recommended food pairings and general price points on one particular wine in each episode.

== Host ==
Sterling has blogged for and hosted The Naked Wine Show since 2008 and has written for the show in Canada's National Post newspaper about her travels to wine destinations like France's Blois and Chaumont.

== Awards ==
The Naked Wine Show was the recipient of the Best Best Critic or Review Series at the 2010 Tasty Awards in San Francisco, winning out over other popular shows like Wine Library TV and Check, Please!.
