= To the Stars: The Autobiography of George Takei =

1994 autobiography by actor George Takei

- Book cover
- Author: George Takei
- Language: English
- Subject: Autobiography
- Genre: Non-fiction
- Publisher: Pocket Books
- Publication date: October 1994
- Publication place: United States
- Media type: Hardcover
- Pages: 352
- ISBN: 0-671-89008-5
- OCLC: 31049797
- Dewey Decimal: 791.45/028/092 B 20
- LC Class: PN2287.T138 A3 1994

To the Stars: The Autobiography of George Takei, Star Trek's Mr. Sulu is an autobiography by actor George Takei, first published by Pocket Books in 1994. Takei describes his early childhood and the time his family spent in Japanese American internment, and experiences which shaped his motivation towards political activism. He initially entered University of California, Berkeley with the plan to attend architecture school, but later told his parents he wanted to be an actor and graduated with a degree in drama. He discusses his early acting roles and his experiences on Star Trek, including conflicts with William Shatner. Takei was pleased when his character Sulu had a prominent role as Captain of the starship Excelsior in the movie Star Trek VI.

The book received positive reviews in Booklist, Publishers Weekly, and the Austin American-Statesman, and a journalist for the Los Angeles Times recommended the work as part of a holiday gift list. To the Stars was selected to be displayed for a month in the William J. Clinton Presidential Library.

== Contents ==
The book begins in the spring of 1942 as Takei and his family are on a train traveling towards the Rohwer War Relocation Center in Arkansas. Takei recounts the four years his family spent in Japanese American internment, his experiences there, and the aftermath of those experiences. The book also provides background and research into the 120,000 Japanese Americans who were interned in similar camps. Takei's parents were identified as "disloyals", and sent to the maximum security Tule Lake War Relocation Center in northern California. Takei's family left Tule Lake in 1946 and he describes their tough time readjusting to life after being in the internment camps. He excelled in his early studies and skipped the third grade. He recounts an incident from fourth grade where the teacher referred to him as "that little Jap boy", and the emotions he still carries looking back on that event.

Takei describes the labor of picking strawberries as a teenager, and how this gave him new understanding of the word "backbreaking". While working, Takei discovered a plan by other Japanese American strawberry farmers to cheat Mexican laborers that had been working with them, and he went and confronted the Japanese American workers to demand that the Mexicans be paid the same. This event gave him an understanding of the importance of activism and the difference that an individual can make. He later became motivated to get more involved in activism and representing others, running for elected office in junior high and high school, volunteering for civic, state and federal political campaigns, and ultimately running himself unsuccessfully for a Los Angeles City Council seat vacated by Tom Bradley in 1973.

Takei entered architecture school at University of California, Berkeley, but told his parents during his freshman year that he wanted to become an actor. His parents told him they would support him if he first got a college degree, and he went on to obtain a degree in theater arts from UC Berkeley. Takei played a Japanese soldier wrongly accused of the murder of his fiancée at a production of Made in Japan at Playhouse 90. He received some acting advice from Harry Guardino during a live TV performance of the play. He went on to receive roles on Perry Mason and Return from the River Kwai, and in a civil rights play called Fly Blackbird!.

He recounts a chance encounter with William Shatner shortly after filming the pilot to Star Trek, where at first Shatner did not recognize him. He also recounts other tensions between himself and Shatner. Takei played character Nim in John Wayne's The Green Berets, and when he returned to Star Trek found that some of his lines had been given to a new character, Pavel Chekov, played by Walter Koenig. He recounts his jealousy at hearing this news. Takei describes the filming of Star Trek II: The Wrath of Khan and his attempts to inject more substance into his character of Sulu. When he heard that there was a plan to replace the original Star Trek cast with new crew members for Star Trek V, Takei rallied fans at twelve consecutive Star Trek conventions, and Paramount Studios dropped plans to change the crew. In Star Trek VI, Takei's character Sulu is Captain of the starship Excelsior, and plays an integral role in rescuing the starship Enterprise.

== Reception ==
Ray Olson gave the book a favorable review in Booklist, commenting that Takei describes incidents in the book in "an anecdotal style that sounds as if he's honed it at many a Trekkers' convention". Olson concluded his review with: "So boldly go and read his book." A review in Publishers Weekly notes: "this lively memoir reveals the author's upbeat but pragmatic nature". The work received a positive review in Transpacific, where it was described as "compelling". The reviewer commented: "In fact, this unlikely celebrity book may well turn out to be the richest, most satisfying yet written on the Asian American experience." The Austin American-Statesman described the book as an "eloquent recollection" of Takei's life in internment camps and later experiences as an actor.

Susan King of the Los Angeles Times recommended the book as part of a holiday gift list. In November 2003, the book was selected to be among books displayed in the William J. Clinton Presidential Library for the month. Takei wrote an inscription in the book addressed to Clinton: "Dear President Clinton, with whom I share an Arkansas boyhood. Live long and prosper."
