= William Shatner =

Canadian actor (born 1931)

William Shatner OC
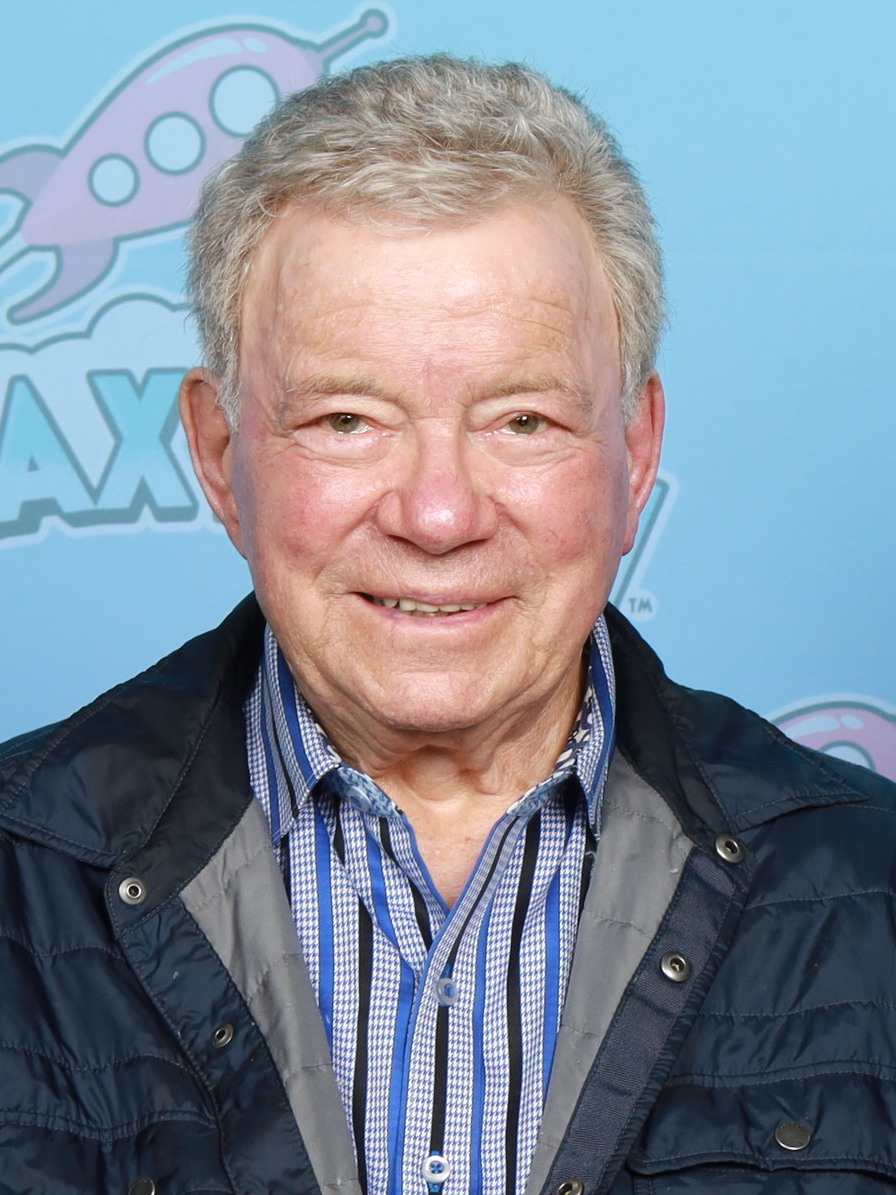
- Shatner in 2026
- Born: March 22, 1931 (age 95); Montreal, Quebec, Canada
- Education: McGill University (BCom)
- Occupations: Actor; author; director; musician; producer
- Years active: 1951–present
- Works: List of works
- Spouses: Gloria Rand (m. 1956; div. 1969); Marcy Lafferty (m. 1973; div. 1996); Nerine Kidd (m. 1997; died 1999); Elizabeth Anderson Martin (m. 2001; div. 2020)
- Children: 3, including Melanie
- Awards: Full list
- Honours: Officer, Order of Canada
- Website: williamshatner.com

William Shatner (born March 22, 1931) is a Canadian actor. From 1966 to 1994, he starred as Captain James T. Kirk in the Star Trek franchise, from his debut as the captain of the starship Enterprise in the second pilot of the first Star Trek television series to his final appearance as Captain Kirk in the seventh Star Trek feature film, Star Trek Generations.

Shatner began his screen acting career in Canadian films and television productions before moving into guest-starring roles in various American television shows. He appeared as Captain Kirk in all the episodes of Star Trek: The Original Series, 21 of the 22 episodes of Star Trek: The Animated Series, and the first seven Star Trek movies. He has written a series of books chronicling his experiences before, during and after his time in a Starfleet uniform. He has also co-written several novels set in the Star Trek universe and a series of science fiction novels, the TekWar sequence, that were adapted for television. Outside Star Trek, Shatner played the eponymous veteran police sergeant in T. J. Hooker (1982–1986), hosted the reality-based television series Rescue 911 (1989–1996), guest starred on the detective series Columbo, and appeared in the comedy film Miss Congeniality (2000).

Shatner's television career after his last appearance as Captain Kirk embraces comedy, drama and reality shows. In seasons 4 and 5 of the NBC series 3rd Rock from the Sun, he plays the alien "Big Giant Head" to whom the main characters report. From 2004 until 2008, he starred as attorney Denny Crane in the final season of the legal show The Practice and the entire run of its spinoff, Boston Legal. The role of Denny Crane won Shatner two Emmy Awards, one for his contributions to each series. In 2016, 2017 and 2018, Shatner starred in both seasons of NBC's Better Late Than Never, a comical travel series in which a band of elderly celebrities toured east Asia and Europe. Since 2019, Shatner has hosted The UnXplained.

Aside from acting, Shatner has had a career as a recording artist, starting with his 1968 album, The Transformed Man. Shatner's cover versions of songs are dramatic recitations of their lyrics rather than musical performances: the most notable are his versions of the Beatles' "Lucy in the Sky with Diamonds", Bob Dylan's "Mr. Tambourine Man", and Elton John's "Rocket Man". His most successful album was his third, Seeking Major Tom (2011), which includes covers of Pink Floyd's "Learning to Fly", David Bowie's "Space Oddity" and Queen's "Bohemian Rhapsody".

In 2021, Shatner flew into space aboard Blue Origin NS-18, a Blue Origin sub-orbital mission. At age 90 he became the oldest person to fly in space and one of the first 600 to do so. In 2024, Ed Dwight, also age 90, but 48 days older than Shatner, flew on the suborbital Blue Origin NS-25 spaceflight.

== Early life ==
Shatner was born on March 22, 1931, in the Notre-Dame-de-Grâce neighbourhood of Montreal, Quebec, Canada, to a Conservative Jewish household. His parents were Ann (née Garmaise; 1905–1992) and Joseph Shatner (1898–1967), a clothing manufacturer. He is the middle of three children; his older sister was Joy Rutenberg (1928–2023) and his younger sister is Farla Cohen (born 1940). His patrilineal family name was Schattner; his grandfather, Wolf Schattner, anglicized the spelling. All four of Shatner's grandparents were Jewish immigrants from settlements in Ukraine and Lithuania, which were then under the rule of Austria-Hungary and the Russian Empire.

Shatner attended two schools in Notre-Dame-de-Grâce, Willingdon Elementary School and West Hill High School, and is an alumnus of the Montreal Children's Theatre. He studied economics at the McGill University Faculty of Management in Montreal, where he graduated with a Bachelor of Commerce degree in 1952. Shatner was a camp counselor at a B'nai B'rith camp in the Laurentians. Over six weeks, Shatner helped teenage Holocaust survivor Fred Bild learn English.

In 2011, McGill University awarded him an honorary Doctorate of Letters. He was granted the same accolade by the New England Institute of Technology in May 2018.

== Acting and literary career ==
=== 1951–1966: Early stage, film, and television work ===
Shatner's film career began while he was still attending college. In 1951, he had a small role in a Canadian comedy drama, The Butler's Night Off: its credits list him as Bill Shatner, and describe his role simply as "a crook". After graduating, he worked as an assistant manager and actor at both the Mountain Playhouse in Montreal and the Canadian National Repertory Theatre in Ottawa before joining the Stratford Shakespeare Festival in Ontario.

His roles at the festival included a part in Marlowe's Tamburlaine, in which he made his Broadway debut in 1956. His brief appearance in the opening scene of a high-profile production of Sophocles's Oedipus Rex by Tyrone Guthrie introduced him to television viewers across the whole of Canada. In Henry V, he combined playing the minor role of the Duke of Gloucester with understudying Christopher Plummer as the king: when a kidney stone obliged Plummer to withdraw from a performance, Shatner's decision to present a distinctive interpretation of his role rather than imitating his senior's impressed Plummer as a striking manifestation of initiative and potential. Plummer later appeared as a Klingon adversary of Captain Kirk's in Star Trek VI: The Undiscovered Country.

Guthrie too rated the young Shatner very highly, later recalling him as the most promising actor that his festival employed, and for a time, he was seen as a potential peer of Steve McQueen, Paul Newman and Robert Redford. In the view of Pat Jordan, author of an in-depth profile of Shatner for The New York Times, his subsequent failure to achieve the acclaim accorded to his starrier contemporaries was attributable to his professional philosophy of "work equals work", and his consequent participation in many "forgettable" projects that probably did his career more harm than good. On the eve of his momentous casting as James Kirk, he was in Jordan's opinion seen merely as an actor who "showed up on time, knew his lines, worked cheap and always answered his phone".

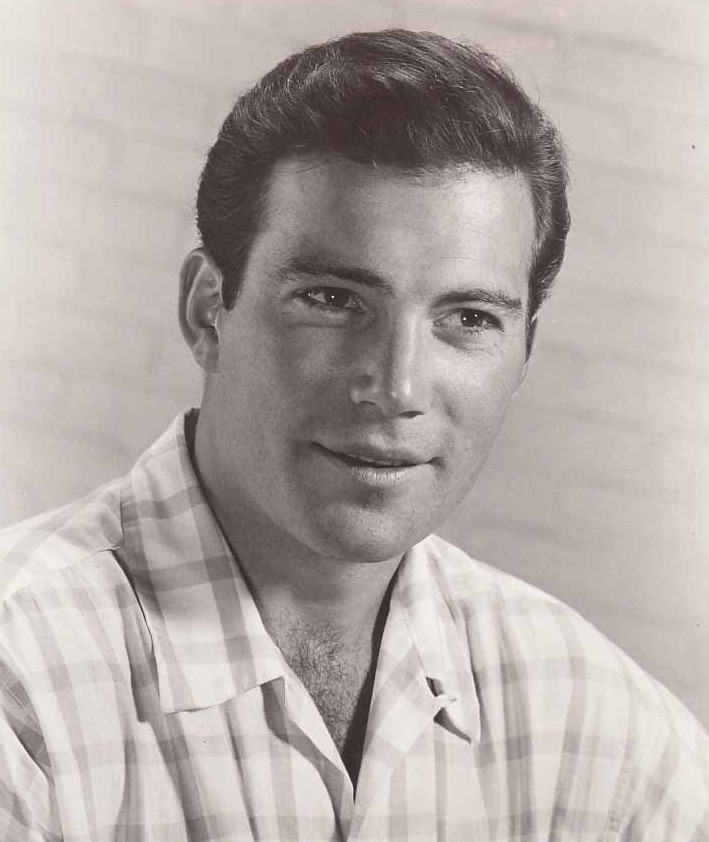
Shatner in a publicity photo in 1958

In 1954, Shatner decided to leave Stratford and move to New York City in the hope of building a career on the Broadway stage. He was soon offered the chance to make his first appearance on American television: in a children's program called The Howdy Doody Show, he created the role of Ranger Bob, co-starring with a cast of puppets and Clarabell the Clown, whose dialogue with Shatner consisted entirely of honks on a bicycle horn.

It was four years before he won his first role in a major Hollywood movie, appearing in the MGM film The Brothers Karamazov as Alexei, the youngest of the brothers, in a cast that included Yul Brynner. In December 1958, directed by Kirk Browning, he appeared opposite Ralph Bellamy as a Roman tax collector in Bethlehem on the day of Jesus's birth in a Hallmark Hall of Fame live television production entitled The Christmas Tree, the cast list of which included Jessica Tandy, Margaret Hamilton, Bernadette Peters, Richard Thomas, Cyril Ritchard, and Carol Channing. His American television profile was heightened further when he had a leading role in an episode in the third (1957–58) season of Alfred Hitchcock Presents, "The Glass Eye".

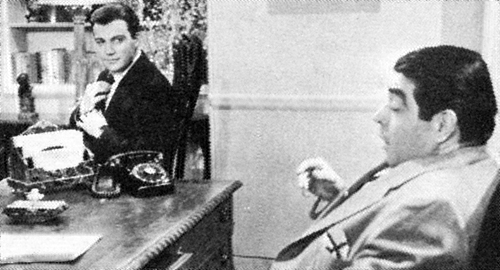
Shatner as Archie Goodwin (left) and Kurt Kasznar as Nero Wolfe in the aborted 1959 CBS television series Nero Wolfe

In 1959, Shatner received good reviews in the role of Lomax in The World of Suzie Wong on Broadway. In March of that year, while still performing in that production, he also played detective Archie Goodwin in what would have been television's first Nero Wolfe series, had it not been aborted by CBS after shooting a pilot and a few episodes.

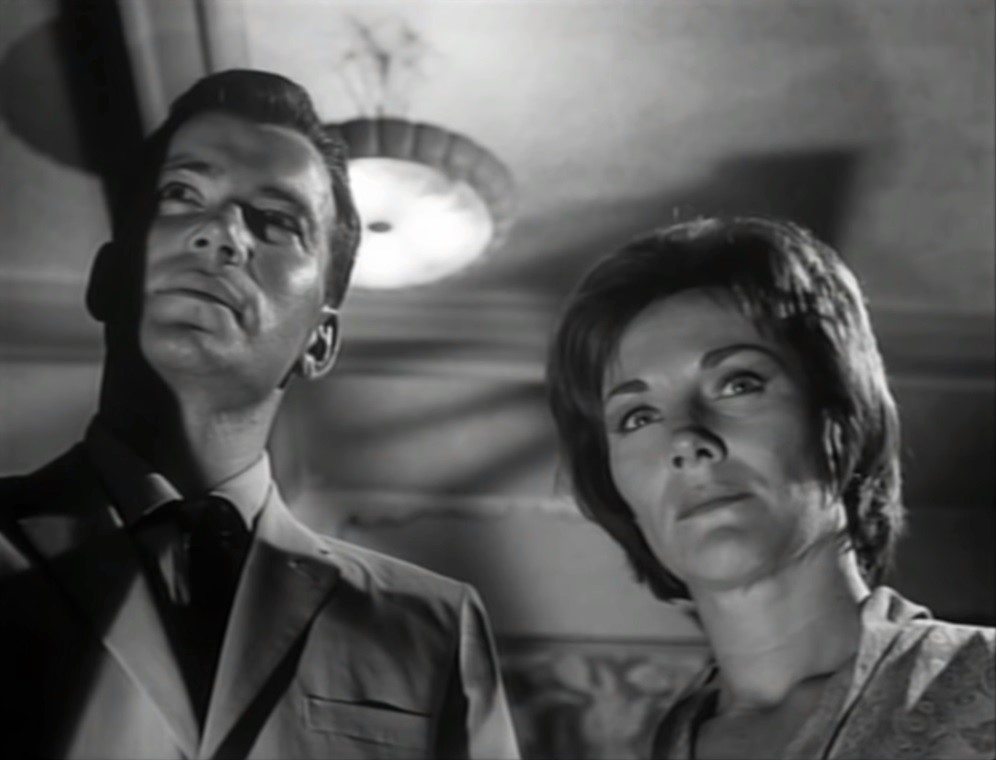
Shatner and Jeanne Cooper in The Intruder (1962)

Shatner appeared in two episodes of The Twilight Zone, "Nick of Time" (1960) and "Nightmare at 20,000 Feet" (1963); when the anthology film The Twilight Zone: The Movie was produced twenty years later, the movie climaxed with a remake of the latter episode. He appeared twice as Wayne Gorham in NBC's Outlaws (1960), a Western series with Barton MacLane and then returned to Alfred Hitchcock Presents for a 5th-season episode, "Mother, May I Go Out to Swim?".

In 1961, co-starring with Julie Harris, he appeared on Broadway in A Shot in the Dark, directed by Harold Clurman; Gene Saks and Walter Matthau took part in the play too, Matthau winning a Tony Award for his performance. Shatner was featured in two episodes of the NBC television series Thriller ("The Grim Reaper" and "The Hungry Glass") and the film The Explosive Generation (1961). He took the lead role in Roger Corman's movie The Intruder (1962), which Stanley Kauffmann of The New Republic described as Shatner's first interesting performance, and had a supporting role in the Stanley Kramer film Judgment at Nuremberg (1961). In the 1963–64 season, he appeared in an episode of the ABC series Channing. In 1963, he starred in the Family Theater production called "The Soldier" and received credits in other programs of The Psalms series. That same year, he guest-starred in Route 66, in the episode "Build Your Houses with Their Backs to the Sea".

In 1964, Shatner guest-starred in the second episode of the second season of the ABC science fiction anthology series The Outer Limits, "Cold Hands, Warm Heart". Also that year, he appeared in an episode of the CBS drama The Reporter, "He Stuck in His Thumb", and played a supporting role in the Western feature film The Outrage, a remake of Akira Kurosawa's Rashomon starring Paul Newman, Laurence Harvey, Claire Bloom and Edward G. Robinson. The same year, Shatner was cast in an episode of The Man from U.N.C.L.E. that featured Leonard Nimoy, later to be his co-star in Star Trek.

Also in 1964, he played the titular Alexander in the pilot for a proposed series called Alexander the Great alongside Adam West as Cleander. The series was not picked up, and the pilot remained unaired until 1968, when it was repackaged as a TV movie to capitalize on the fame that West and Shatner had won in the interim. Shatner had hoped that the series would be a major success, but West was apparently unsurprised by its failure to proceed, later castigating the pilot for "one of the worst scripts I have ever read" and recalling it as "one of the worst things I've ever done."

In 1965, Shatner guest-starred in 12 O'Clock High as Major Curt Brown in the episode "I Am the Enemy". In the same year, he had the lead role in a legal drama, For the People, starring as an assistant district attorney married to a woman played by Jessica Walter; the show's cancellation after its 13-episode first season allowed him to walk onto the bridge of the Enterprise the following year.

Shatner starred in the 1966 gothic horror film Incubus (Esperanto: Inkubo) the second feature-length movie ever made with all dialogue spoken in Esperanto. He also starred in an episode of Gunsmoke in 1966 as the character Fred Bateman. He appeared as attorney-turned-counterfeiter Brett Skyler in a 1966 episode of The Big Valley, "Time to Kill". In 1968, he starred in the little known Spaghetti Western White Comanche, playing both a white-hat character and his black-hat evil twin: Johnny Moon, a virtuous half-Comanche gunslinger, and Notah, a bloodthirsty warlord.

=== 1966–1969: Star Trek on television ===
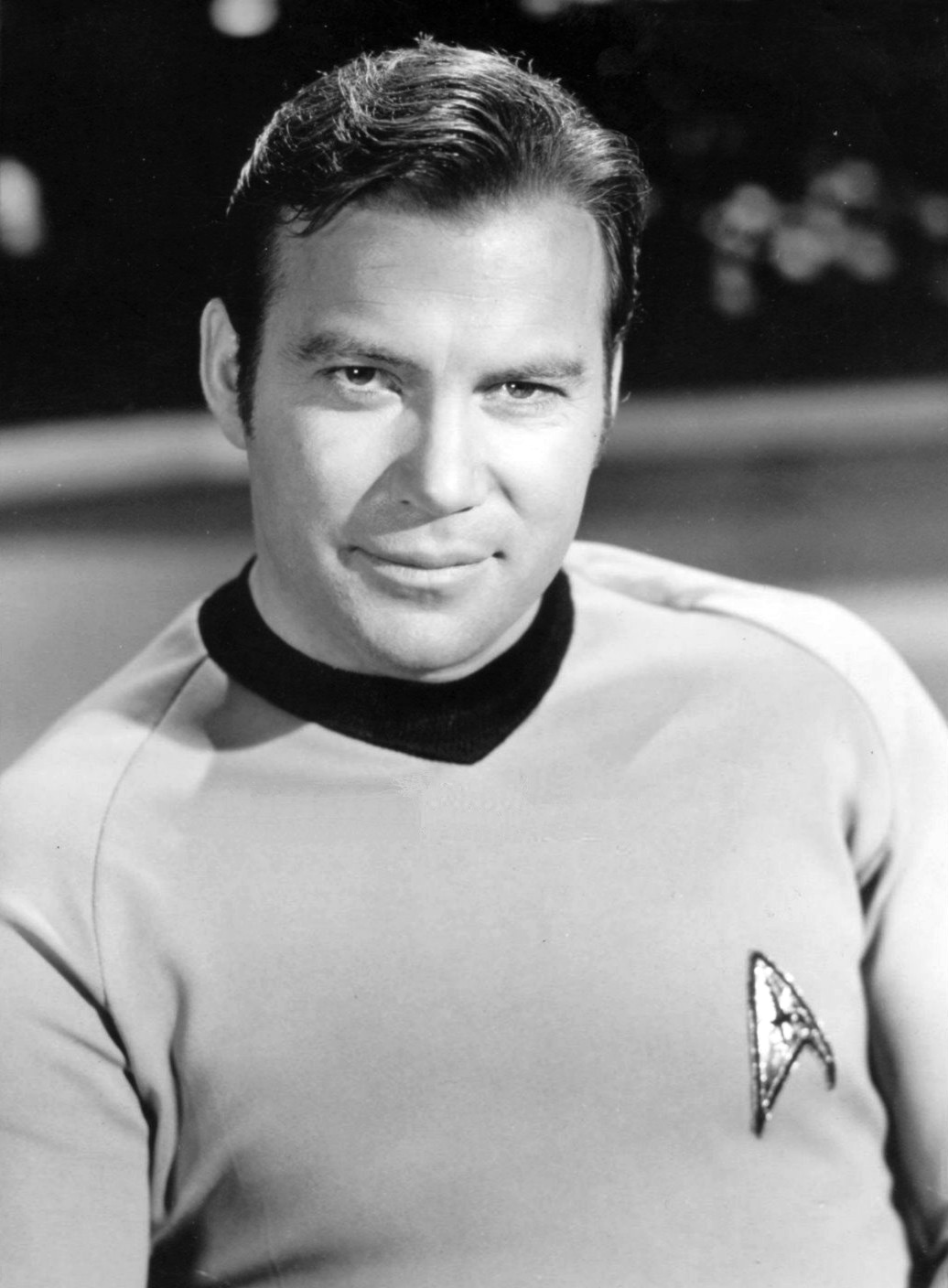
Shatner as Captain James T. Kirk in Star Trek (1966–1969)

Shatner was cast as Captain James T. Kirk for the second pilot of Star Trek, titled "Where No Man Has Gone Before". He was then contracted to play Kirk for the remainder of the show, and he sat in the captain's chair of the USS Enterprise from 1966 to 1969. During its original run on NBC, the series achieved only modest ratings, and it was cancelled after three seasons and seventy-nine episodes. Plato's Stepchildren, aired on November 22, 1968, earned Shatner a footnote in the history of American race relations: a kiss that Captain Kirk planted on the lips of Lieutenant Uhura (Nichelle Nichols) is often cited as the first example of a white man kissing a black woman on scripted television in the United States. In 1973, Shatner returned to the role of Kirk, albeit only in voice, in the animated Star Trek series, which ran for two seasons and twenty-two episodes.

=== 1970–1978: Overcoming typecasting ===
In the early 1970s, in the immediate aftermath of the cancellation of Star Trek in 1969, Shatner had difficulty finding employment, being somewhat typecast as James Tiberius Kirk. With very little money and few acting prospects, he was for a time so poor that he was reduced to living in a truck-bed camper between theater jobs.

Shatner's film work in this phase of his career was limited to such B-movies as Roger Corman's Big Bad Mama (1974), the horror film The Devil's Rain (1975) and Kingdom of the Spiders (1977). On television, he made a critically praised appearance as a prosecutor in a 1971 PBS adaptation of Saul Levitt's play The Andersonville Trial and was also seen in major parts in the movies The People (1972) and The Horror at 37,000 Feet (1973). He had a starring role too in the western-themed secret agent series Barbary Coast during 1975 and 1976, and appeared as a guest of the week in many popular shows of that decade, including Columbo, Ironside, Kung Fu, Mission: Impossible, The Rookies and The Six Million Dollar Man. One of the special skills that Shatner was able to offer to casting directors was an expertise in a martial art: he was taught American Kenpo karate by the black belt Tom Bleecker, who had in turn been trained by the founder of American Kenpo, Ed Parker.

To supplement his income from acting, Shatner performed as a celebrity guest in a multitude of television game shows, among them Beat the Clock, Celebrity Bowling, The Hollywood Squares, Match Game, Tattletales and Mike Stokey's Stump the Stars. His curriculum vitae in this genre included several visits to The $10,000 Pyramid and its more generous sequels, shows in which contestants attempted to guess a word or phrase with the help of hints from a famous partner. Shatner's contributions to the Pyramid series included a week-long match-up that pitted him against Leonard Nimoy in an event billed as "Kirk versus Spock". In a 1977 episode, he perpetrated a blunder that has been preserved on YouTube: at the climax of the show, attempting to guide his partner to the phrase "things that are blessed", he blurted out the word "blessed" instead of, as he had intended, citing the Virgin Mary. His mistake meant that the contestant paired with him was automatically disqualified from receiving what would have been a prize of $20,000. Shatner was so furious at himself over his error that he leapt out of his chair, picked it up and threw it out of the show's iconic Winner's Circle. During an Archive of American Television interview, Richard Dawson disclosed that when Mark Goodson was considering whom to employ as the host of the pilot of Family Feud (1976), he would have chosen Shatner if he had not been intimidated into awarding the position to Dawson by a threat from Dawson's agent.

Advertising agencies also played a part in helping Shatner through his post-Kirk doldrums. Among the television commercials for which he was hired were spots promoting General Motors' Oldsmobile brand, Promise margarine, the British Columbia-based supermarket chain SuperValu and its Ontarian equivalent, Loblaws; Canadian viewers became familiar with the former hero of Starfleet reassuring them that "At Loblaws, more than the price is right. But, by gosh, the price is right."

=== 1979–1989: Star Trek films and T. J. Hooker ===
After Star Trek was cancelled, it acquired a cult following among people watching syndicated reruns of the series, and Captain Kirk became a cultural icon. Fans of the show—so-called Trekkies—began organizing conventions where they could meet like-minded enthusiasts, buy Star Trek merchandise and enjoy question and answer sessions with members of the show's regular cast. Many of the actors who had crewed the Enterprise became frequent guests at these events, Shatner included.

In the mid-1970s, noting the growing appetite for Star Trek, Paramount began pre-producing a sequel show, Star Trek: Phase II, in which they planned to present new, younger actors alongside the stars of the original series. However, astounded by the enormous success that George Lucas's film Star Wars achieved in 1977, the studio decided that Star Trek would earn them more money if the next adventure of the Enterprise took place not on television but in theatres. Shatner and all the other original Star Trek cast members returned to their roles when Paramount produced Star Trek: The Motion Picture, released in 1979. He went on to play Kirk in six further Star Trek films: Star Trek II: The Wrath of Khan (1982), Star Trek III: The Search for Spock (1984), Star Trek IV: The Voyage Home (1986), Star Trek V: The Final Frontier (1989), Star Trek VI: The Undiscovered Country (1991) and—in a story that culminated in the captain's self-sacrificial death—Star Trek Generations (1994). His final appearances as James Tiberius Kirk were in the movie sequences of the video game Starfleet Academy (1997), in a 2006 DirecTV advertisement that used footage from Star Trek VI: The Undiscovered Country and at the 2013 Academy Awards, in which he reprised the role for a comedic interlude with the show's host, Seth MacFarlane.

Although the resurrection of Star Trek from oblivion only came about because of the enthusiasm of Trekkies, Shatner's attitude towards them is not uncritical. In a much-discussed 1986 Saturday Night Live sketch about a Star Trek convention, he advised a room full of Trekkies to "get a life". The comment was an apt summary of the view of his fans that he had expressed in several interviews. Their adoration of him took unwelcome forms almost from the beginning of his time as Captain Kirk; as early as April 1968, a group of them attempted to tear his clothes from him as he left 30 Rockefeller Plaza. His amusement at the behaviour of the lunatic fringe of his admirers was reflected in the romantic comedy movie Free Enterprise (1998), in which he contributed a caricature of himself to a film that satirized some Trekkies' Kirk idolatry. He also mocked the cavalier, almost superhuman, persona of Captain Kirk in the films Airplane II: The Sequel (1982) and National Lampoon's Loaded Weapon 1 (1993).

In 1982, Shatner was once again the leading character of a high-profile television show when he was cast as a veteran Los Angeles police sergeant in T. J. Hooker. Running for five seasons and ninety-one episodes until 1986, the series partnered Shatner with Heather Locklear and James Darren, later to be a recurring cast member of the third live-action Star Trek show, Deep Space Nine. The success of T. J. Hooker led to Shatner's hosting the popular dramatic re-enactment series Rescue 911 from 1989 to 1996. His career diversified further in the 1980s when he began working as a director, taking charge of many episodes of T. J. Hooker. A clause in his Star Trek contract giving him parity with Leonard Nimoy meant that after Nimoy's directing of Star Trek IV: The Voyage Home, Shatner was entitled to direct a Star Trek movie too: he exercised his right in Star Trek V: The Final Frontier, although many Trekkies were disappointed by the film that he delivered, something that he attributed principally to the weakness of the movie's visual effects. His growing success on television and in movie theatres in the 1980s did not lead him to stop working for advertisers. The VIC-20 home computer, for example, was endorsed by him both on television and in print.

On May 19, 1983, the iconic status of Captain Kirk was acknowledged with a ceremony celebrating Shatner's being awarded the 1,762nd star on the Hollywood Walk of Fame. Shatner also has a star on Canada's Walk of Fame, granted to him in recognition of his being the first Canadian actor to star in major series on three American networks—NBC, CBS and ABC.

=== 1989–1999: TekWar and other diversifications ===
Working on T. J. Hooker inspired Shatner with the idea of developing a television show in which he would play a character that would be a hybrid of Hooker and Kirk—a hard-boiled former police officer working as a private investigator in a dystopian future. When the production of Star Trek V was delayed by a Writer's Guild strike, Shatner began transforming his initial concept into a novel, assisted by an established author of pulp science fiction, Ron Goulart. Goulart described his contribution to Shatner's endeavour as merely that of an adviser, but Shatner credits him with rewriting. The first fruit of their collaboration, TekWar, was published in 1989, and launched a sequence of books that sold hundreds of thousands of copies. The novels led to four TekWar television movies, in which Shatner played not the lead character but his boss, Walter Bascom. Shatner reprised the role in a television series that followed, as well as directing several episodes of it himself, but its run on the USA Network, Syfy and Canada's CTV was brief.

In December 1989, Shatner took part in the British television series This Is Your Life, a show in which a celebrity is ambushed by the host and then taken to a studio for the story of his life to be told in a stream of anecdotes related by his acquaintances: Shatner's episode began with Michael Aspel taking him by surprise on the set of the Starship Enterprise at Universal Studios in Hollywood. In 1994, Shatner revisited Columbo to play the murderer-of-the-week in the episode "Butterfly in Shades of Grey". In 1995, he narrated Peter Kuran's documentary film Trinity and Beyond: The Atomic Bomb Movie, and his TekWar franchise expanded into the world of computer games with a first-person shooter release, William Shatner's TekWar. In 1996, an episode entitled Eye, Tooth saw him guest-starring in Will Smith's television show, The Fresh Prince of Bel-Air. He narrated a television miniseries shot in New Zealand A Twist in the Tale (1998). In the television series 3rd Rock from the Sun, Shatner appeared in several 1999–2000 episodes as the "Big Giant Head", a high-ranking officer from the same alien planet as the Solomon family who becomes a womanizing party-animal on Earth. The role earned Shatner an Emmy Award nomination.

In the late 1990s, Shatner became closely associated with the travel website priceline.com, appearing in many television commercials for the company as a pompous caricature of himself. He has said that while it is true that his work for priceline earned him stock options, reports that they are now worth hundreds of millions of dollars are exaggerated. He was also the chief executive officer of the Toronto, Ontario-based C.O.R.E. Digital Pictures, a special effects studio that operated from 1994 to 2010.

In May 1999, Simon & Schuster published Shatner's book Get a Life!, a memoir of his experiences with Trekkies. As well as anecdotes about Star Trek conventions, the book features interviews with some of the most devoted fans of the Star Trek franchise, including conversations with several Trekkies who regard the show not just as entertainment but as philosophically significant.

=== 2000–2009: Further films, and Denny Crane ===
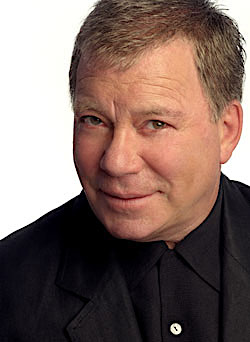
Shatner, 2005

In the Sandra Bullock comedy movie Miss Congeniality (2000), Shatner played the supporting role of Stan Fields, the co-host of the Miss United States Pageant; his future Boston Legal co-star Candice Bergen took part in the film too. Shatner also appeared in Miss Congeniality 2: Armed and Fabulous (2005), in which Stan Fields is kidnapped in Las Vegas together with the winner of the pageant of the previous year. (Life imitated art in Gary, Indiana in 2001, when Shatner visited the town to host the Miss USA Pageant for real). In Osmosis Jones (2001), a high-concept satirical movie that blended live action with animation, Shatner voiced Mayor Phlegmming; the film depicted the cells and microbiota of a human body as the citizens of a community, the city of Frank, governed by an egoistic politician who prioritizes his convenience and political self-interest over the welfare of his public. In Groom Lake, released the following year, Shatner repeated his Star Trek V feat of directing and starring in a movie based on a story of his own invention—a film exploiting the interest in Area 51 kindled by The X-Files, and co-starring a young Amy Acker, later best known as a regular colleague of Joss Whedon. In 2003, Shatner appeared in Brad Paisley's Celebrity and Online music videos along with Little Jimmy Dickens, Jason Alexander and Trista Rehn. He also had a supporting role in the comedy Dodgeball: A True Underdog Story (2004), which starred Ben Stiller and Vince Vaughn. In the October 2004 issue of Star Trek Communicator, Manny Coto, one of the producers of Star Trek: Enterprise, revealed that he was planning a three-episode story arc guest-starring Shatner, but the cancellation of the series shortly afterwards meant that Shatner was denied the opportunity to take part in it.

After David E. Kelley saw Shatner's commercials, he brought Shatner on to the final season of the legal drama The Practice. According to Pat Jordan, Shatner's Emmy Award-winning role, the eccentric but highly capable attorney Denny Crane, was essentially "William Shatner the man ... playing William Shatner the character playing the character Denny Crane, who was playing the character William Shatner." Shatner took the Crane role to Boston Legal and won a Golden Globe and an Emmy in 2005, and was Emmy nominated again in 2006, 2007, 2008 and 2009. With his 2005 Emmy accolade, he became one of the few actors (along with co-star James Spader as Alan Shore) to win an Emmy Award while playing the same character in two different shows. Shatner remained with Boston Legal until, after five seasons and one hundred and one episodes, it ended in 2008.

Two high-profile animated pictures released in 2006 featured Shatner in their cast. In DreamWorks' Over the Hedge, he voiced Ozzie, an opossum; in Walt Disney's The Wild, he had the role of the movie's villain, Kazar, a megalomaniacal wildebeest. In January 2007, he began posting daily autobiographical vlogs on the LiveVideo platform in a project that he named ShatnerVision; rebranded as The Shatner Project, his vlogging migrated to YouTube the following year. In December 2008, he experimented with the chat show genre in the humorous Shatner's Raw Nerve, which aired until March 2011. He expanded his work on YouTube in 2009, supplying the voice of Don Salmonella to the animated series The Gavones.

Shatner made several guest appearances on The Tonight Show with Conan O'Brien, including in cameos in which he made fun of the Republican politician Sarah Palin. He opened mock-hostilities on July 27, 2009, with a poetry slam-inspired recitation of the speech in which she had resigned the governorship of Alaska. Two days later, he ridiculed some of the tweets that she and Levi Johnston, the father of her grandchild, had published on Twitter. On December 11, 2009, he returned to Palin once more to read excerpts from her autobiography, Going Rogue: An American Life, and she, taking his teasing in good part, responded by reciting extracts from his 2008 memoir, Up Till Now (co-written with David Fisher, who later collaborated with Shatner on a book about Leonard Nimoy and Shatner's relationship with him). Shatner also contributed to O'Brien's recurring "In the Year 3000" feature, which began with Shatner's disembodied head floating in space and delivering the segment's portentous tag line: "And so we take a cosmic ride into that new millennium; that far off reality that is the year 3000. It's the future, man".

Shatner was not "offered or suggested" a role in the 2009 film Star Trek. Director J. J. Abrams said in July 2007 that the production was "desperately trying to figure out a way to put him in" but that to "shove him in ... would be a disaster", an opinion echoed by Shatner in several interviews. At a convention held in 2010, Shatner described the film as "wonderful". Two years before its release, his own tale of how the characters of the original series of Star Trek might have come together was published in his novel Star Trek: Academy – Collision Course.

=== 2010–present: Later projects ===
In April 2010, Shatner began hosting the Discovery Channel show Weird or What?, which aired until August 2012. Each episode of the series supplied lovers of arcana with several segments exploring news reports relating to left-field topics such as UFOs and cryptozoology. Later that year, his career as a comic television actor reached its zenith in a CBS sitcom based on Justin Halpern's Twitter feed Shit My Dad Says, $#*! My Dad Says, which was cancelled in May 2011 three months after the first broadcast of its final episode. 2011 also saw him guest-starring in one episode of the USA Network's Psych, "In for a Penny", playing the estranged father of Junior Detective Juliet O'Hara (Maggie Lawson) (a role that he reprised in the show's 2012 season). For Trekkies, his most notable project of the year was the first Star Trek film that he had directed since Star Trek V. The Captains, which he also wrote and presented, was a feature-length documentary in which he interviewed all five of the actors who had played the principal role in the Star Trek sequels that had been created up to that point—Patrick Stewart of Star Trek: The Next Generation, Avery Brooks of Star Trek: Deep Space Nine, Kate Mulgrew of Star Trek: Voyager, Scott Bakula of Star Trek: Enterprise and Chris Pine of J. J. Abrams's 2009 movie. The film also included a conversation between Shatner and his Star Trek VI co-star Christopher Plummer, a sequence celebrating a friendship that began when the two actors both took part in the Stratford Shakespeare Festival and reflecting Shatner's profound admiration for his colleague.

Shatner's 2012 began with his return to his roots in theatre. In February, he appeared on Broadway in a one-man show called Shatner's World: We Just Live in It. After a three-week run at the Music Box, the show toured throughout the United States. In May, he was the guest presenter on the British satirical television quiz show Have I Got News for You, earning a footnote in the history of neologisms by melding "pioneer" and "pensioner" into the portmanteau coinage "pensioneer". On July 28, he appeared on the premium cable TV channel Epix as the star of Get a Life!, a documentary film about Star Trek fandom developed from the 1999 book about Trekkies that he had written in the aftermath of his Saturday Night Live rebuke to them. On September 25, he revisited the music video genre, appearing as a home plate umpire in the crooner Brian Evans's baseball-themed "At Fenway".

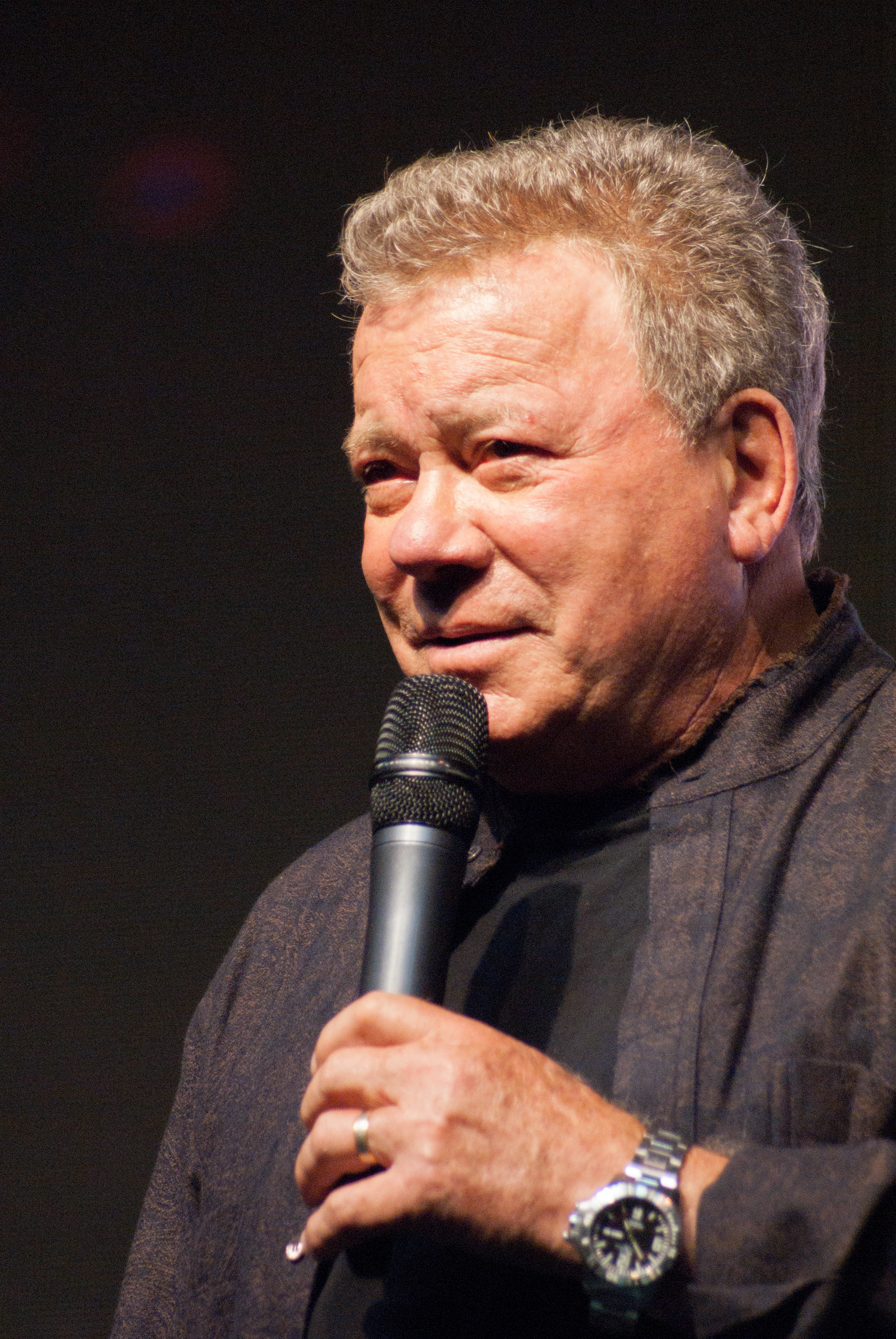
Shatner at Destination Star Trek Europe, 2016

On April 24, 2014, Shatner performed an autobiographical one-man show on Broadway, which was filmed for subsequent screening in more than 700 theatres across Australia, Canada and the United States. A large portion of the revenue of the project went to charity. In 2015, he played Mark Twain in an episode of the Canadian historical crime drama series Murdoch Mysteries, and Croatoan – the dangerous, interdimensional father of Audrey Parker – in the last episodes of the fifth and final season of SyFy channel's fantasy series Haven. In August of that year, Trekkies were treated to a sequel to The Captains which he produced, scripted and directed and in which he starred: William Shatner Presents: Chaos on the Bridge, a behind-the-scenes documentary film about Star Trek: The Next Generation.

Premiering on August 23, 2016, the NBC reality miniseries Better Late Than Never followed Shatner and a quartet of other aging celebrities—Terry Bradshaw, Jeff Dye, George Foreman and Henry Winkler—as they took a grand tour around Japan, South Korea and Southeast Asia. Shatner joked that Bradshaw, famous as a quarterback with the Pittsburgh Steelers, was "putty in my hands". Another new enterprise that he launched that year was Shatner Singularity, a publisher of comic-books, which has a list including the graphic novel Stan Lee's "God Woke" by Lee and Mariano and Fabian Nicieza. The book won the 2017 Independent Publisher Book Awards' Outstanding Books of the Year Independent Voice Award.

Shatner's most notable television work in 2017 was in the second season of Better Late Than Never: a preview episode of December 11, 2017, was followed by an official season premiere on the New Year's Day of 2018. His equestrian enthusiasm found an outlet in the animated children's show My Little Pony: Friendship is Magic, where in the seventh season episode "The Perfect Pear" he supplied the voice of Grand Pear, the estranged maternal grandfather of Applejack and her siblings. 2017 also saw him appearing in a second music video with Brian Evans, this time promoting Evans's cover of the Dolly Parton song "Here You Come Again".

Shatner hosted and executive-produced the series The UnXplained on The History Channel, which premiered on July 19, 2019. Since its premiere, the show has received very negative reviews from critics. Writing in Irish Film Critic, Thomas Tunstall reported that the show's "subject matter runs all over the board", as if designed for an audience with attention deficit disorder. Though Shatner enthusiastically poses many questions, he provides far fewer satisfactory answers than he should – perhaps by design to retain the sense of mystery."

William Shatner
(@WilliamShatner)
tweeted:

"My prayers are with the people of the Ukraine, as I watch events unfolding on TV with such brave people fighting an overwhelming force, I am reminded ironically enough of Stalingrad, when the Nazis, on their way to Moscow, thought they could overwhelm that city. The people of Stalingrad & the army defending Stalingrad fought the Nazis to a standstill. History CAN repeat itself."

February 28, 2022

Shatner became the focus of political controversy in 2021, when it was revealed that a popular science documentary show that he would host, I Don't Understand with William Shatner, was scheduled to be aired on RT, formerly known as Russia Today, from July 12. RT's editor-in-chief, Margarita Simonyan, said that "Captain Kirk has come over to the good side." Criticized by a Russian journalist for his involvement with the government-controlled outlet, Shatner branded his accuser a hypocrite and compared his contract with RT to the arrangement through which the channel had acquired the right to broadcast American football games. Four days after the Russian invasion of Ukraine on February 24, 2022, Shatner issued a statement via Twitter expressing unqualified support for the Ukrainians in the resistance that they were mounting against their assailants. On March 2, he withdrew from his show, citing the invasion as his reason for doing so. RT America ceased transmitting altogether on March 3.

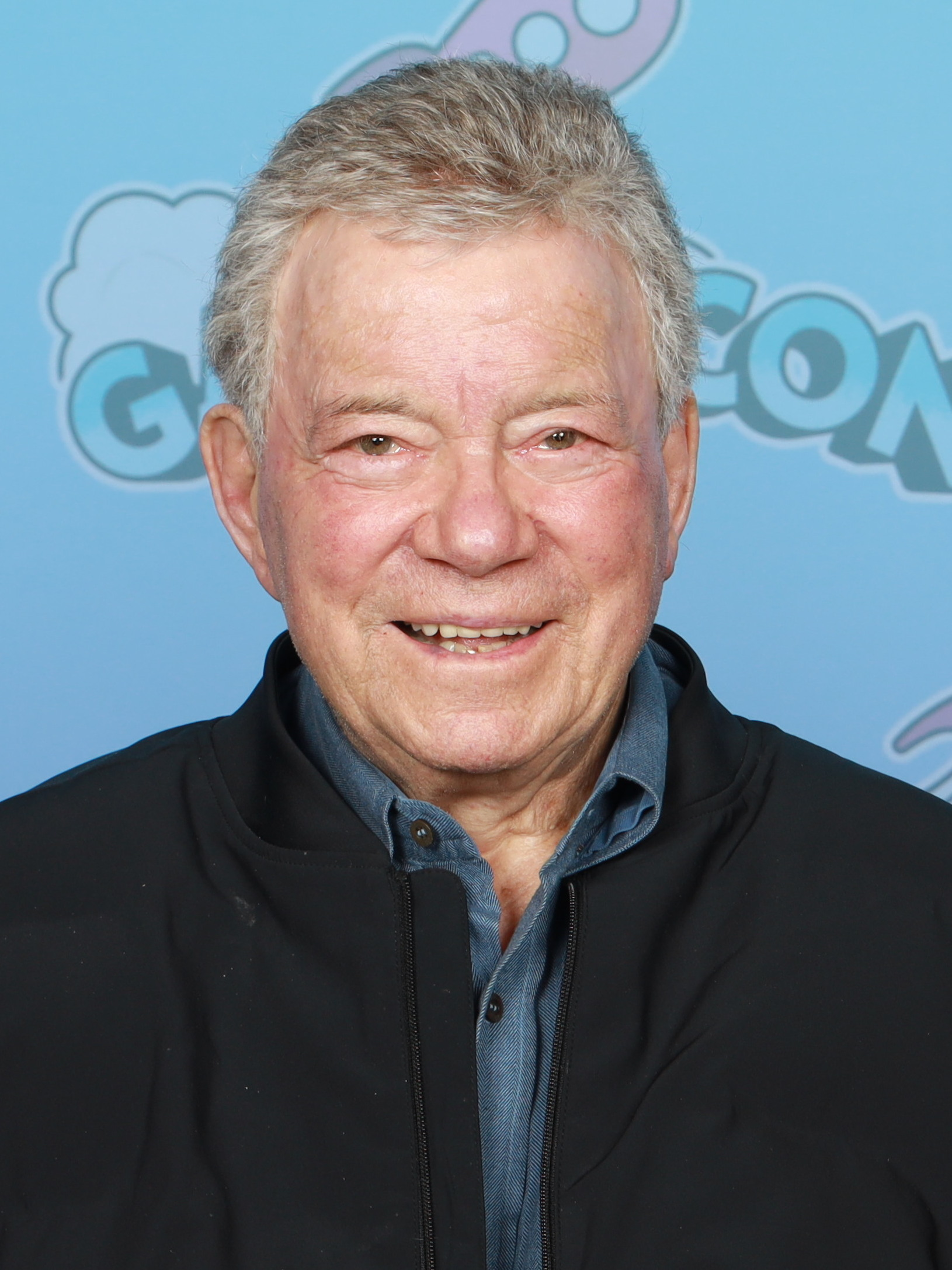
Shatner in 2025

Also in 2021, Shatner starred in the film Senior Moment, which co-starred Jean Smart and Christopher Lloyd. The movie was released in March 2021 on the same week Shatner turned 90.

In 2022, Shatner competed in season eight of The Masked Singer as "Knight" (depicted as a knight riding a golden goose). A running gag is that the golden goose that "Knight" rides keeps trying to attack Nick Cannon. He was eliminated in the first episode alongside Eric Idle as "Hedgehog" and Chris Kirkpatrick as "Hummingbird".

In 2024, Shatner appeared in an ad criticizing salmon farms.

In 2025, Shatner received a Special Lifetime Achievement Saturn Award.

== Career as a recording artist ==
=== The Transformed Man and other albums ===
Shatner made his recording debut in 1968, with the release of an album titled The Transformed Man. It offered readings from classic plays followed by dramatically inflected recitations of the texts of thematically related popular songs, both set against a background of instrumental accompaniment. Among the hits that Shatner covered were Bob Dylan's "Mr. Tambourine Man" and the Lennon–McCartney song "Lucy in the Sky with Diamonds." Shatner would stay loyal to his idiosyncratic, talk-singing style from this album throughout his recording career.

In 1977, a performance that Shatner had given during a tour in 1971 was released on a Lemli Records double album, William Shatner Live. The LPs' bill of fare included him reminiscing about his work on Star Trek and reading excerpts from Edmond Rostand's Cyrano de Bergerac, H. G. Wells's The War of the Worlds and Bertolt Brecht's Galileo. A year later, the recording was reissued by another company, again as a double LP, now titled William Shatner Live: Captain of the Starship. Devoid of Star Trek branding because of licensing restrictions, the album's sleeve was decorated with a photograph of Shatner brandishing an upturned camera tripod in the style of Jim Kirk going into battle with a phaser rifle.

Shatner's second studio album did not materialize until over 30 years after his first: Has Been was released in October 2004. Produced by Ben Folds, it included a number of songs co-written with Folds and arranged by him, as well as a cover of the Pulp hit "Common People" performed with Joe Jackson. Seeking Major Tom followed in October 2011. Initially announced by Shatner under that title on February 4, it was later promoted by him as Searching for Major Tom before reverting to the name that he had given it originally. Shatner's colleagues on the project included several notable musicians: the country star Brad Paisley, Zakk Wylde of Black Label Society, Peter Frampton, Brian May of Queen, Steve Howe from Yes, John Wetton from King Crimson and Asia, Ritchie Blackmore from Deep Purple, Alan Parsons and Bootsy Collins of Parliament-Funkadelic. Astronautically themed and with a general flavour of heavy metal, the album featured covers of Pink Floyd's "Learning to Fly", David Bowie's "Space Oddity" and Queen's "Bohemian Rhapsody".

Shatner's fifteen-track album Ponder the Mystery, produced by Billy Sherwood, was issued in October 2013. Among the musicians who contributed to it were Mick Jones, Simon House, Steve Vai, Al Di Meola, Steve Howe's Yes colleague Rick Wakeman, Joel Vandroogenbroeck, Edgar Winter, Nik Turner, Vince Gill, Edgar Froese, Robby Krieger, Dav Koz, George Duke and Zoot Horn Rollo. The record's credits attributed all its music to Sherwood and all its song texts to Shatner. Shatner's first venture into the country music genre, Why Not Me, appeared in August 2018, with a new partner in the form of Jeff Cook, best known as a founding member of the American band Alabama. Released on the Heartland Records Nashville label, this album also included guest vocals by Neal McCoy, Home Free and Cash Creek. A holiday collection, Shatner Claus, appeared in October 2018, with Shatner now aided and abetted by Iggy Pop, Henry Rollins, Todd Rundgren, Billy Gibbons and others. Shatner's ninth album, The Blues, was released on October 2, 2020, and reached the number one slot of the Billboard Blues Chart fifteen days later. A tenth album, Bill, was announced by Shatner on August 26, 2021, and released on September 24.

As well as recording his own series of discs, Shatner has taken part in other artists' releases too. Ben Folds's 1998 album Fear of Pop: Volume 1 features Shatner on two tracks, "In Love" and "Still in Love". (Jamie Halliday, the founder of Audio Antihero, named the former as his "favourite song of all time".) On June 28, 2002, Shatner appeared with Brian Evans at the San Carlos Institute Theatre in Key West, Florida and duetted with him in the songs "What Kind of Fool Am I" and "The Lady Is a Tramp": the concert was later released as the album Brian Evans Live with Special Guest: William Shatner. In 2005, he was heard in the track "'64 – Go" on the Lemon Jelly album '64–'95. And he provided the lead vocals on the progressive rock artist Ben Craven's track "Spy In The Sky Part 3" in Craven's album Last Chance To Hear, released in March 2016. Among the music videos for other artists that featured him were one for Ben Folds's "Landed", in which he played the part of a producer, and two for Brad Paisley, one promoting "Celebrity" and the other "Online", with the latter containing a meta-reference in which Shatner appeared to be heartbroken when told that he could not sing.

=== Performances of songs on television and in films ===
Television audiences were introduced to Shatner's unorthodox musicianship not long after Star Trek had made him famous. In 1978, while hosting the fifth presentation of Saturn Awards bestowed by the Academy of Science Fiction, Fantasy and Horror Films, he performed a version of Elton John's Rocket Man that went on to become a staple of comedic parody. In an episode of Dinah Shore's talk show, Dinah!, he used his appearance on it to perform Harry Chapin's "Taxi". On June 9, 2005, he contributed his version of "My Way" to the presentation of George Lucas's AFI Life Achievement Award, backed by a chorus line of dancers in Imperial Stormtrooper costumes who ended Shatner's segment by picking him up and carrying him offstage. On December 11, 2005, he launched Comedy Central's Last Laugh 2005 with a skit in which he appeared as a Lucifer celebrating how well the year had gone from the point of view of Hell. On March 29, 2006, TV Land aired a Shatner-centred episode of their Living in TV Land series subtitled "William Shatner in Concert". The program featured footage of him working with Ben Folds on Has Been, and included a sequence in which he performed with Folds's band and Joe Jackson; it climaxed with a defiant rendition of "Lucy in the Sky with Diamonds" that was punctuated by him giving the finger. To promote his Biography Channel talk show Shatner's Raw Nerve, he guest-hosted World Wrestling Entertainment's flagship show WWE Raw on February 1, 2010, and performed several wrestlers' entrance theme songs. In the fourth episode of his sitcom $♯*! My Dad Says, his character, Ed Goodson, delivered a Shatner-style Karaoke treatment of Right Said Fred's "I'm Too Sexy". In the same scene, a waitress asked Ed if he wanted to tackle "Rocket Man" and he answered "Not tonight!". On November 4, during a television appearance on the Lopez Tonight show, he performed a cover of Cee Lo Green's song "F**k You".

Several of the movies in which Shatner participated featured him in a musical context. In the closing scene of Free Enterprise, he recited an oration of Mark Antony's from Julius Caesar over a rap delivered by The Rated R, a duet listed in the movie's credits as "No Tears for Caesar". In Miss Congeniality, he performed the song "Miss United States", which was included in the movie's soundtrack album. He contributed the voice of Buzz Lightyear to the Star Command anthem "To Infinity And Beyond" in the 2000 film Buzz Lightyear of Star Command: The Adventure Begins.

In 2007, one of Shatner's albums, Has Been, was taken up by the writer and choreographer Margo Sappington (notable for her work on Oh! Calcutta!) as the basis for a dance project, Common People, created for the Milwaukee Ballet. Shatner attended the premiere of the work and arranged for it to be filmed. The resulting feature documentary, William Shatner's Gonzo Ballet, was favourably received when it was unveiled at the Nashville Film Festival on April 17, 2009.

In addition to treating songs with apparently serious intent, Shatner has sometimes offered performances which, like many passages from his memoirs, are exercises in self-mockery. Instances include his versions of the five nominees in the Best Song from a Movie category at the 1992 MTV Movie Awards. He also mined this vein of self-deprecating comedy as the lynchpin of Priceline's television advertising campaign. In one commercial for the company, he joined with his frequent collaborator Ben Folds in an ironic version of the Diana Ross hit "Do You Know Where You're Going To?".

== Suborbital flight ==
=== Space Shuttle Discovery ===
Ever since its Apollo 15 lunar mission, NASA has awakened its astronauts with specially tailored recordings. On March 7, 2011, the crew of STS-133 on the Space Shuttle Discovery began their last day docked to the International Space Station with Alexander Courage's title theme for Star Trek and Shatner reciting an adapted version of the show's famous introduction: "Space, the final frontier. These have been the voyages of the Space Shuttle Discovery. Her 30-year mission: To seek out new science. To build new outposts. To bring nations together on the final frontier. To boldly go, and do, what no spacecraft has done before."

=== 2021 spaceflight ===
Shatner took part in Blue Origin's second sub-orbital human spaceflight, Blue Origin NS-18, on October 13, 2021. Invited to join Chris Boshuizen, Glen de Vries and Audrey Powers on the trip by Blue Origin's creator, the entrepreneur and Trekkie Jeff Bezos, he began his real-world visit to space at Blue Origin's Launch Site One in West Texas, travelling on the RSS First Step, a New Shepard suborbital rocket capsule. In a televised post-flight conversation with Bezos, Shatner articulated experiencing the overview effect, a deepened understanding of the fact that the ecosphere of the Earth is but a thin, fragile skin enveloping its planet. Aged 90 years, 205 days, he became the oldest person to fly into space, surpassing Wally Funk, who had flown on Blue Origin's first crewed spaceflight at the age of 82 in July 2021. Shatner reflected on his experience seeing Earth from space, urging action to combat biodiversity loss.

Shatner's record was surpassed on May 19, 2024, by retired U.S. Air Force pilot Ed Dwight, who at the age of 90 years, 253 days became the oldest person to fly into space.

== Personal life ==
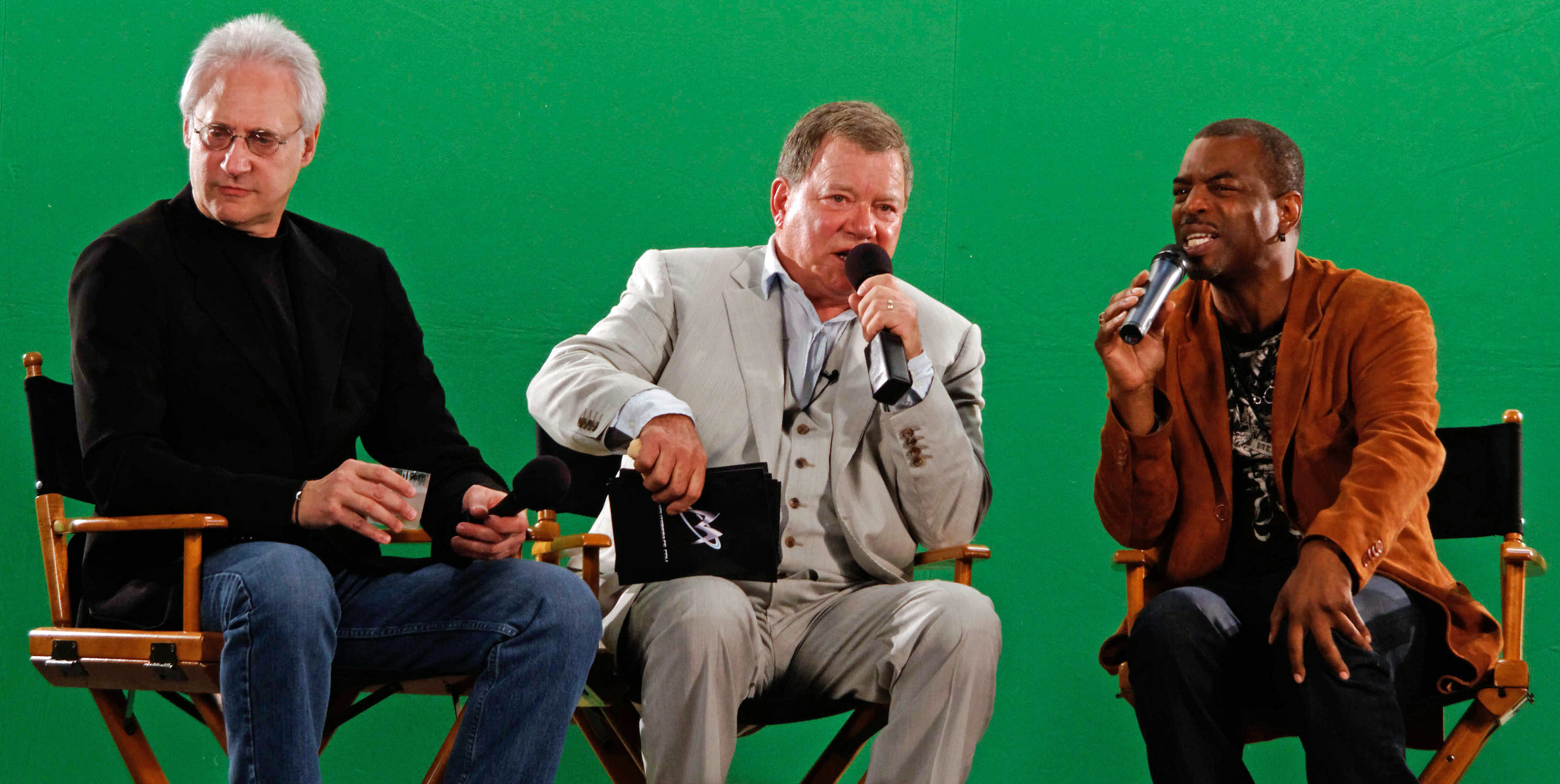
Shatner (center) with Brent Spiner (left) and LeVar Burton in 2010

Shatner dislikes watching himself perform. He has said that there are episodes of Star Trek and Boston Legal he has never seen. According to Shatner, the only Star Trek movie that he has screened is the one that he directed and so necessarily viewed when it was being edited, Star Trek V: The Final Frontier, although in his 1993 book Star Trek Memories, he recalls how disappointed he felt when he attended the premiere of the first Star Trek movie, Robert Wise's Star Trek: The Motion Picture.

Shatner is a longtime U.S. resident and has a green card.

=== Family ===
Shatner has been married four times. His first wife was a Canadian actress, Gloria Rand (née Rabinowitz), whom he married on August 12, 1956. The couple had three daughters: Leslie (born 1958), Lisabeth (born 1961) and Melanie (born 1964). Shatner left Rand while acting in Star Trek: The Original Series, after which he divorced her in March 1969.

Shatner's second wife was Marcy Lafferty, the daughter of the television producer Perry Lafferty. Lasting from 1973 to 1996, their marriage was Shatner's longest, but did not produce any children.

Shatner's third wife was Nerine Kidd, whom he married in 1997. Returning home at around 10 p.m. on August 9, 1999, he found her lying lifeless at the bottom of their backyard swimming pool. She was forty years old. An autopsy revealed that her blood contained both alcohol and diazepam, the coroner decided that the cause of her death was accidental drowning and the Los Angeles Police Department, agreeing that there was no evidence of foul play, closed its file on the case. Speaking to the press shortly after his wife's death while visibly still in a state of shock, Shatner said that she had "meant everything" to him and described her as his "beautiful soulmate". He urged the public to support Friendly House, a non-profit organization that helps women to rebuild their lives after trying to free themselves from alcoholism or other forms of drug addiction. He later told Larry King in an interview that "my wife, whom I loved dearly, and who loved me, was suffering with a disease that we don't like to talk about: alcoholism. And she met a tragic ending because of it".

In his 2008 book Up Till Now: The Autobiography, Shatner disclosed how Leonard Nimoy, himself no stranger to alcoholism, had done his best to try to avert the tragedy that Kidd's affliction threatened:

Leonard Nimoy's personal experience of alcoholism now came to play a central role in my life and it helped us bond together in a way I never could have imagined in the early days of Star Trek. After Nerine and I had been to dinner with Leonard and Susan Nimoy one evening, Leonard called and said: "Bill, you know she's an alcoholic?" I said I did. I married Nerine in 1997, against the advice of many and my own good sense. But I thought she would give up alcohol for me. We had a celebration in Pasadena, and Leonard was my best man. I woke up about eight o'clock the next morning and Nerine was drunk. She was in rehab for 30 days three different times. Twice she almost drank herself to death. Leonard (sober many years) took Nerine to Alcoholics Anonymous meetings, but she did not want to quit.

In 2000, a Reuters story reported that Shatner was planning to write and direct The Shiva Club, a dark comedy about the grieving process inspired by his wife's death. Shatner's 2004 album Has Been included a spoken word piece, "What Have You Done", that describes his anguish upon discovering Nerine's body.

In 2001, Shatner married Elizabeth Anderson Martin. In 2004, she co-wrote the song "Together" on Shatner's album Has Been. Shatner filed for divorce from Elizabeth in 2019. The divorce was finalized in January 2020. Although Shatner and Martin remain divorced, as of 2025 they have reconciled and Shatner is once again referring to her as his wife. As of 2022, Shatner has one great-grandchild.

=== Relationships with other actors ===
Shatner first appeared on screen with Leonard Nimoy in 1964 when both actors guest-starred in an episode of The Man from U.N.C.L.E., "The Project Strigas Affair". Much like their characters on Star Trek, Shatner and Nimoy had a professional rivalry that developed into a close friendship. After the show's cancellation in 1969, they reunited in Star Trek: The Animated Series, and they also worked together on both The $20,000 Pyramid and T. J. Hooker. In 2016, Shatner revealed that despite their long and affectionate relationship, he and Nimoy had not spoken to each other in the five years before Nimoy's death the year before.

Nimoy spoke about their mutual rivalry during the Star Trek years:

Bill's energy was very good for my performance, because Spock could then be the cool individual. Our chemistry was successful right from the start. [We were] very competitive, with a sibling rivalry up to here, and after the show had been on the air a few weeks and they started to get a lot of mail about Spock, then the dictum came down from NBC: "Oh, give us more of that guy! They love that guy!" Well, that can be a problem for a leading man who's hired as the star of the show.

On an episode of the A&E series Biography, where it was also divulged that Nimoy was Shatner's best man at his wedding with his fourth wife Elizabeth, Nimoy said, "Bill Shatner hogging the stage? No. Not the Bill Shatner I know." When Nimoy died in 2015, Shatner said, "I loved him like a brother. We will all miss his humor, his talent, and his capacity to love." Although Shatner was unable to take part in Nimoy's funeral due to other commitments, his daughters attended in his place, and he celebrated his friend's life in an online memorial.

Shatner has been friends with actress Heather Locklear since 1982, when she began co-starring with him on T. J. Hooker. As she combined her work on Hooker with a semi-regular role in Dynasty—also an Aaron Spelling production—she was asked by Entertainment Tonight whether she was finding her schedule difficult. She said that working with both Shatner and her experienced colleagues on Dynasty could be daunting, but that her nervousness motivated her to turn up on set well prepared. After T.J. Hooker ended, Shatner helped her to get other roles, and after Nerine Shatner's death in 1999, she was solicitous in comforting him in his bereavement. They worked together again in 2005, when she appeared in two episodes of Boston Legal as Kelly Nolan, a woman being tried for killing her much older, wealthy husband. The episodes' story involves Shatner's character becoming attracted to Nolan and trying to insert himself into her defence. Asked how she came to be cast in the series, Locklear said, "I love the show. It's my favorite show, and I sorta kind of said, 'Shouldn't I be William Shatner's illegitimate daughter, or his love interest?'"

For years, some of Shatner's Star Trek co-stars accused him of being difficult to work with, particularly George Takei, Walter Koenig, and James Doohan. Shatner acknowledged the resentment that Koenig and Doohan felt towards him; in Star Trek Movie Memories, Shatner recalled having to work with them again while filming 1994's Star Trek Generations:

I was a lot more worried about working with Walter Koenig and Jimmy Doohan, two men who have made it clear on any number of occasions that my name is generally near the top of their shit lists.

Takei wrote about his issues with Shatner in his 2004 memoir, To the Stars. Interviewed in London in 2023, Takei made it clear that the passage of time had done nothing to assuage his hostility towards his former colleague: "Shatner is a cantankerous old fossil. All of us have had problems with him.... There is this fiction that Bill and Leonard [Nimoy] were good friends, but we know better—Leonard privately expressed his irritation with Bill. Bill is an egocentric, self-involved prima donna." However, in 2025, Takei posted: "Just days ago, Bill Shatner celebrated his 94th birthday—wishing him continued health and happiness. Live long and prosper, my friends."

Koenig, on the other hand, accepted Shatner's invitation to appear on his interview series Shatner's Raw Nerve in 2011 and made it clear that the animosity that he had once felt towards Shatner had long since dissipated. Doohan too achieved a warmer relationship with Shatner eventually, although it took a long time for the two men to build a rapport. In the 1990s, Shatner made numerous attempts to reconcile with Doohan without success.

James Doohan was the only former Star Trek co-star who declined to be interviewed by Shatner for his first memoir, Star Trek Memories (1993). However, Doohan did contribute to Shatner's sequel, and an Associated Press article published at the time of Doohan's final convention appearance in August 2004. At the time, Doohan was already suffering from severe health problems, and it was reported that he had forgiven Shatner, and the two actors had achieved the friendship as senior citizens that had eluded them as younger men.

Sky Conway, the organizer of the penultimate convention attended by Doohan, was a witness to Doohan and Shatner burying the hatchet. "At our show: 'The Great Bird of the Galaxy' at El Paso, Texas in November 2003, a celebration of Gene Roddenberry and Star Trek, Bill and Jimmy went on stage together. Behind the scenes and before they went on stage, they hugged each other, apologized and expressed their love and admiration for each other. Bill specifically asked me to get them together so he could make amends and clear the air between the two of them before it was too late."

=== Health ===
Shatner began suffering from tinnitus, a hearing disorder. Researchers think that tinnitus can be triggered by exposure to very loud noise, and Shatner believes that his falling prey to it might be the result of a pyrotechnical accident that happened during the shooting of the 1967 Star Trek episode "Arena". His condition has been ameliorated by habituation therapy that involved his wearing an earpiece delivering low-level white noise which "helped his brain put the tinnitus in the background". He is a supporter of a tinnitus charity, the American Tinnitus Association.

Shatner revealed in 2020 that he suffers from swollen joints and various age-related "aches and pains". He treats his discomfort with cannabidiol oil, a dietary supplement extracted from cannabis.

In 2022, Shatner's daughter Melanie Gretsch was diagnosed with stage IV breast cancer. A year later, Shatner received a diagnosis of stage IV melanoma after a tumor was found in his cheek, with metastases in his brain and lungs. Shatner received immunotherapy for two years and became cancer-free, along with his daughter in 2024.

=== Work with horses ===
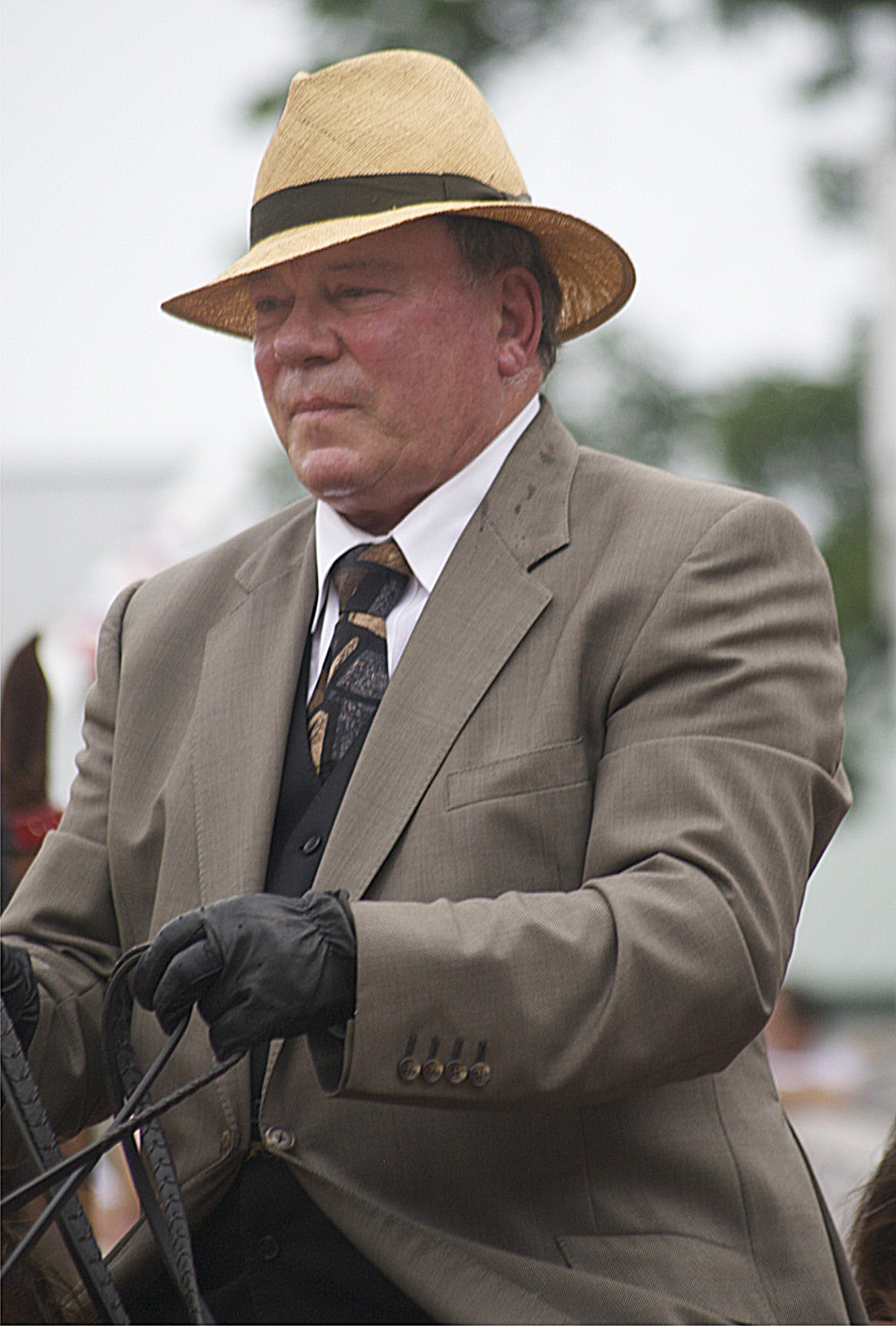
Shatner on horseback at a horse show in 2011

In his spare time, Shatner enjoys breeding and showing American Saddlebreds and Quarter Horses. He rode one of his own mares, Great Belles of Fire, in Star Trek Generations. He has a 360-acre (150 ha) farm near Versailles, Kentucky, named Belle Reve Farm (from the French beau rêve, "Beautiful Dream" – Belle Reve was the name of Blanche Dubois' and her sister Stella's family home in A Streetcar Named Desire), where he raises American Saddlebreds. Three of his notable horses are Call Me Ringo, Revival, and Sultan's Great Day.

In 2018, Shatner was awarded the National Reining Horse Association Lifetime Achievement Award in the National Reining Horse Association Hall of Fame. In 2019, he won a world championship with his Standardbred road horse Track Star while showing at the Kentucky State Fair World's Championship Horse Show in Louisville.

=== Philanthropy ===
Shatner participates in the Hollywood Home Games of the World Poker Tour, in which celebrities try to win money for their favourite charities. But most of his philanthropic work is associated with his love of horses. Since 1990, he has been one of the most important supporters of the Hollywood Charity Horse Show, which raises money for organizations serving children, and his horse farm works with the Central Kentucky Riding for Hope "Horses for Heroes" program.

In 2006, Shatner sold a kidney stone that had been surgically extracted from him to the online auction company GoldenPalace.com for $25,000, after rejecting an earlier bid of $15,000 with the observation that collectors had paid more than $100,000 for one of his Star Trek tunics. In an appearance on The View on May 16, 2006, he said that the proceeds of the sale and an additional $20,000 raised from the cast and crew of Boston Legal had been donated to the housing charity Habitat for Humanity.

=== Public appearances ===
Shatner was king of the Mardi Gras Bacchus parade in 1987. On New Year's Day 1994, Shatner was the grand marshal of the Tournament of Roses Parade in Pasadena, California. Instead of leading the event in the customary classic car, he presided over it from horseback. He also took part in the coin toss before the subsequent 80th Rose Bowl college football game (the teams vying for Rose Bowl honours that year were the University of Wisconsin Badgers and the University of California Los Angeles Bruins; the Badgers beat the Bruins by 21–16).

Shatner was one of several speakers at the closing ceremony for the 2010 Winter Olympics in Vancouver, British Columbia, on February 28, 2010. In 2014, he discharged the duties of a grand marshal again at the 102nd Calgary Stampede parade in his native Canada.

Many of Shatner's public appearances reflect Captain Kirk's status as one of science fiction's best known icons. In September 2016, for example, the organizers of the Salt Lake Comic Con invited him to attend their event as their special guest. In 2017, he acted as the honorary captain of a ship hosting "Star Trek: The Cruise", the first Star Trek cruise that CBS Productions licensed, an event celebrating the 50th anniversary of the first broadcast of Star Trek's original pilot episode. Shatner was dismayed that the cruise offered its customers an opportunity to swim with dolphins, and petitioned the CEO of the Norwegian Cruise Line through PETA not to include dolphins in the programme of their 2018 cruise: "The exploitation of any species for profit and entertainment would have violated the Prime Directive." Among the many other Kirk-related dates in his diary were visits to the replica Star Trek: The Original Series set built by James Cawley in Ticonderoga, New York, which saw him guiding small groups of Trekkies on tours of Cawley's version of the Enterprise, and a December 4, 2022, star guest beam-down to the L.A. Comic Con.

=== Social media controversies ===
In 2017, Shatner tweeted support for Autism Speaks, a controversial charity some autism self-advocates dislike. He spent the next few days arguing with autistic people and allies, including citing anti-vaccination website NaturalNews. Days later, Shatner suggested his critics should have kept quiet, eventually calling the episode a misunderstanding.

In 2020, again on Twitter, he argued with other Twitter users for over a month about being called a "straight white cis man".

In 2021, The Forward reported that Shatner was dismissive of a Jewish convert of color, comparing the incident to his arguments about the term "cis" and Autism Speaks. But in 2023, Brent Spiner said in an interview that Shatner had said his Twitter (now X) account was managed by an employee and that Shatner had minimal direct involvement in its content.

== Bibliography ==
=== Fiction ===
- The TekWar series, co-written with Ron Goulart
  - TekWar (1989) ISBN 0-399-13495-6
  - TekLords (1991) ISBN 0-399-13616-9
  - TekLab (1991) ISBN 0-399-13736-X
  - Tek Vengeance (1993) ISBN 0-399-13788-2
  - Tek Secret (1993) ISBN 0-399-13892-7
  - Tek Power (1994) ISBN 0-399-13997-4
  - Tek Money (1995) ISBN 0-399-14109-X
  - Tek Kill (1996) ISBN 0-399-14202-9
  - Tek Net (1997) ISBN 0-399-14339-4
- Star Trek series, with Judith and Garfield Reeves-Stevens, also known as the Shatnerverse
  - Star Trek: The Ashes of Eden, 1995, ISBN 0-671-52035-0
  - Star Trek: The Return, 1996, ISBN 0-671-52610-3
  - Star Trek: Avenger, 1997, ISBN 0-671-55132-9
  - Star Trek: Spectre, 1998, ISBN 0-671-00878-1
  - Star Trek: Dark Victory, 1999, ISBN 0-671-00882-X
  - Star Trek: Preserver, 2000, ISBN 0-671-02125-7
  - Star Trek: Captain's Peril, 2002, ISBN 0-7434-4819-7
  - Star Trek: Captain's Blood, 2003, ISBN 0-671-02129-X
  - Star Trek: Captain's Glory, 2006, ISBN 0-7434-5343-3
  - Star Trek: The Academy – Collision Course, 2007 ISBN 1-4165-0396-X
- War series
  - Man o' War, 1996, ISBN 0-399-14131-6
  - The Law of War, 1998, ISBN 0-399-14360-2
- Quest for Tomorrow series
  - Delta Search, 1997, ISBN 0-06-105274-4
  - In Alien Hands, 1997, ISBN 0-06-105275-2
  - Step into Chaos, 1999, ISBN 0-06-105276-0
  - Beyond the Stars, 2000, ISBN 0-06-105118-7
  - Shadow Planet, 2002, ISBN 0-06-105119-5
- Believe (with Michael Tobias), 1992, ISBN 978-0-425-13296-8
- Comic book adaptations
  - William Shatner's TekWorld (129 pages, February 1994, ISBN 0-87135-985-5)
  - Star Trek: The Ashes of Eden, DC Comics graphic novel, 1995, ISBN 1-56389-235-9
- Samuel Lord Series
  - Zero-G: Book 1, with Jeff Rovin, 2016, ISBN 978-1501111556
  - Zero-G: Green Space , with Jeff Rovin, 2017, ISBN 978-1501111587

=== Non-fiction ===
- Captain's Log: William Shatner's Personal Account of the Making of "Star Trek V: The Final Frontier", as told by Lisabeth Shatner, 1989, ISBN 0-671-68652-6
- Star Trek Memories, with Chris Kreski, 1993, ISBN 0-06-017734-9
- Star Trek Movie Memories, with Chris Kreski, 1994, ISBN 0-06-017617-2
- Get a Life!, with Chris Kreski, 1999, ISBN 0-671-02131-1
- Star Trek: I'm Working on That: A Trek from Science Fiction to Science Fact, with Chip Walter, 2002, ISBN 0-671-04737-X
- Up Till Now: The Autobiography, with David Fisher, 2008, ISBN 0-283-07058-7
- Shatner Rules, with Chris Regan, 2011, ISBN 0-525-95251-9
- Leonard: My Fifty-Year Friendship with a Remarkable Man, with David Fisher, 2016, ISBN 0-316-38837-8
- Spirit of the Horse: A Celebration in Fact and Fable, with Jeff Rovin, 2017, ISBN 978-1250130020
- Live long And ... : What I Might Have Learned Along the Way, with David Fisher, 2018, ISBN 978-1250166692
- Boldly Go: Reflections on a Life of Awe and Wonder, with Joshua Brandon, 2022, ISBN 978-1668007327

=== Audiobooks ===
- 1994: Star Trek Movie Memories – with Chris Kreski – (read by William Shatner), Harper Audio, ISBN 0-06-017617-2
- 2008: Up Till Now – with David Fisher – (read by William Shatner), Highroads Media, ISBN 978-1427204158
- 2011: Shatner Rules – with Chris Regan – (read by William Shatner), Penguin Audio, ISBN 978-1611760231
- 2016: Leonard: My Fifty-Year Friendship with a Remarkable Man – with David Fisher – (read by William Shatner), Macmillan Audio, ISBN 978-1427273239
- 2018: Live Long And …: What I Learned Along the Way – with David Fisher – (read by William Shatner), Macmillan Audio, ISBN 978-1250299116
- 2022: Boldly Go: Reflections on a Life of Awe and Wonder – with Joshua Brandon – (read by William Shatner), Simon & Schuster Audio, ISBN 978-1797147567
