= List of University of North Texas College of Music faculty =

The following is a list of University of North Texas College of Music faculty

== Faculty ==
- Samuel Adler
- Elie Apper
- Violet Archer
- Larry Austin
- Colin Bailey
- Edward A. Baird
- Wilfred Bain
- Joseph Banowetz
- Robert Blocker
- Emanuel Borok
- Jeff Bradetich
- Leon Breeden
- Anshel Brusilow
- Leonard Candelaria ‡
- Eugene Corporon
- Eugene Conley
- Richard Croft ‡
- Lella Cuberli
- Richard Dufallo
- Willard Elliot ‡
- Merrill Ellis
- Marjorie Fulton
- John Giordano ‡
- Carroll Glenn
- Floyd Graham ‡
- Jaymee Haefner
- David Itkin
- Otto Kinkeldey
- Tosca Kramer
- William P. Latham
- Martin Mailman
- Rich Matteson
- Maurice McAdow
- Mary McCormic
- Eliza Jane McKissack
- Cindy McTee
- Dika Newlin
- Norbert Nozy
- Adolfo Odnoposoff
- Jack Petersen ‡
- Darhyl S. Ramsey
- Debra Richtmeyer
- Jim Riggs ‡
- Jay Saunders ‡
- Silvio Scionti
- Lynn Seaton
- Geoffrey Simon
- Ed Soph ‡
- Richard Sparks
- Vladimir Viardo
- Joelle Wallach
- Steve Wiest ‡

‡ Alumnus

== See also ==
- List of University of North Texas College of Music alumni
