= List of University of North Texas College of Music alumni =

== One O'Clock Lab Band alumni ==
=== 1940s ===
- Harry Babasin (1921–1988)
- Herb Ellis, UNT Hon. Doc. '97
- Jimmy Giuffre (1921–2008)
- Gene Roland (1921–1982)

=== 1950s ===
- Euel Box
- Ed Summerlin (1928–2006)

=== 1960s ===
- Dee Barton (1937–2001)
- Larry Cansler
- Bruce Fowler
- James A. Hall
- Billy Harper
- David Hungate
- Franklin D. "Bubba" Kolb
- Tom "Bones" Malone
- Lou Marini
- Dean Parks
- Jim Riggs
- Jay Saunders
- Ed Soph
- Marvin Stamm
- Bill Stapleton (1945–1984)
- Lanny Steele (1933–1994)

=== 1970s ===
- Bob Belden
- Leonard Candelaria
- James Chirillo
- Steve Duke
- Bill Evans
- Conrad Herwig
- Marc Johnson
- Lyle Mays
- Jim Milne
- John B. Riley
- Ray Sasaki
- Mike Smith
- Nick Vincent

=== 1980s ===
- Steve Bailey
- Gregg Bissonette
- Mike Bogle
- Jeff Coffin
- Phil DeGreg
- Dave Pietro
- Tim Ries
- Jim Snidero
- Steve Wiest
- Mike Williams

=== 1990s ===
- Jami Dauber
- Scott Englebright
- Ari Hoenig
- Brad Turner

== Composers/arrangers for the One O'Clock (students & faculty; non-members) ==
=== 1960s ===
- Frank Mantooth

=== 1970s ===
- Rich Matteson ‡

‡ Faculty

== Other alumni ==
- John Abercrombie
- Theodore Albrecht
- Jeff Antoniuk
- John Ardoin
- Steve Bailey
- Arthur Barrow
- William Basinski
- John Beasley
- Matt Bissonette
- William Blankenship
- Craig Bohmler
- Pat Boone
- Cary Boyce
- George Bragg
- Tom Brantley
- Zachary Breaux
- David Breeden
- Eden Brent
- Steven Bryant
- Ronnie Burrage
- Keith Carlock
- Don Carr
- Kristopher Carter
- Matt Chamberlain
- Alton Chung Ming Chan
- Kirk Covington
- Richard Croft ‡
- Carmen Cusack
- Michael Daugherty
- Ivan Davis
- Monte Hill Davis
- Beth Denisch
- Bob Dorough
- John M. Eargle
- Greg Edmonson
- David Egan
- Willard Elliot ‡
- Wilma Cozart Fine
- Jerry Fisher
- Jim Bob Floyd
- Eloy Fominaya
- Bruce Fowler (tenor)
- Robert Gauldin
- Adam Gaynor
- Don Gililland
- Don Gillis
- John Giordano ‡
- Floyd Graham ‡
- Michael Gungor
- Bob Hames
- Craig Handy
- Fareed Haque
- Everette Harp
- Earl Harvin
- Wiley Lee Housewright
- Jerry Hunt
- Dennis Irwin
- Norah Jones
- Brutal Juice
- Richard Kastle
- Roger Kleier
- Bob Lanese
- Sue Ane Langdon
- Charles W. LaRue
- Lecrae
- William Franklin Lee III
- Hannibal Lokumbe
- Don Lucas
- Petronel Malan
- Eric Mandat
- Keshavan Maslak
- Paul Mazzio
- Midlake
- Moonmaids
- Latonia Moore
- Mark Nicolson
- Kevin Noe
- Shara Nova
- Raven Oak
- Spencer Perskin
- Jack Petersen ‡
- Emily Pulley
- Patricia Racette
- Jim Rotondi
- John Sheridan
- Julia Smith
- Snarky Puppy
- Carolyn Steinberg
- B. W. Stevenson
- Fred Sturm
- Leonard Tan
- William Ennis Thomson
- Frederick C. Tillis
- Mark Trojanowski
- Fisher Tull
- Steve Turre
- Douglas Walter
- J.D. Walter
- Rodney Waschka II
- Alison Wedding
- David C. Williams
- Gary Willis
- Chuck Wilson
- Duain Wolfe
- Shara Worden
- Christopher Young

== See also ==
- List of University of North Texas College of Music faculty
