= Douglas Water (disambiguation) =

Douglas Water is a river in Lanarkshire which flows into the Clyde.

Douglas Water may also refer to these geographical features in Scotland:

- Douglas Water, Loch Fyne which flows into Loch Fyne
- the Douglas Water which flows into Loch Lomond at Inverbeg, see Glen Douglas
- the Inveruglas Water, which flows into Loch Lomond at Inveruglas
- Douglas Water (hamlet), a hamlet in South Lanarkshire, named after the river

== See also ==
- Douglas Walter, musician and educator
- River Douglas (disambiguation)
