= Jaymee Haefner =

American harpist and professor

- Genres: Classical
- Occupations: Harpist, music educator
- Instrument: Harp

Jaymee Haefner is an American harpist, recording artist, and music educator. She is a University Distinguished Research Professor and professor of harp at the University of North Texas College of Music. Her work includes performances and recordings as a soloist and chamber musician, publications on the French harpist and composer Henriette Renié, and service in harp organizations.

== Career ==
=== Academic ===
Haefner joined the University of North Texas (UNT) College of Music in 2006 as a lecturer in harp. She was appointed assistant professor in 2016, promoted to associate professor in 2020, and in the same year was appointed Director of Graduate Studies for the College of Music. She became a full professor in 2024.

In 2025, UNT named Haefner a University Distinguished Research Professor in Instrumental Studies.

=== Performance ===
Haefner performs internationally as a soloist, chamber musician, and orchestral harpist. She is principal harpist of the Wichita Falls Symphony Orchestra and has performed with the Dallas Symphony Orchestra, The Dallas Opera, and the Fort Worth Symphony Orchestra.

She has appeared as concerto soloist with the Saginaw Bay Symphony Orchestra, Wichita Falls Symphony Orchestra, University of North Texas Symphony Orchestra, Texarkana Symphony Orchestra, and at the Crested Butte Music Festival. Her chamber collaborations include performances with Chamber Music International, the Crimson Duo, and the Dallas Harp Quartet.

Haefner has premiered works by Libby Larsen, Paul Patterson, Kirsten Broberg, Gary Schocker, Joseph Klein, Patricio da Silva, and other contemporary composers.

=== Professional service ===
Haefner serves on the board of the USA International Harp Competition as treasurer and chair of the finance committee. She served as treasurer of the World Harp Congress Board of Directors from 2011 to 2022.

In 2024, the International Harp Archives were relocated to the University of North Texas, with Haefner appointed as archivist. The move was announced by the American Harp Society and the World Harp Congress.

== Recordings ==
- Fantaisie: Music for Violin and Harp (Crimson, 2015)
- Better Than One: Works by Gary Schocker (Albany Records, 2016)
- Renderings: Modern Music for Violin and Harp (MSR Classics, 2019)
- Patricio da Silva: Music for Violin and Harp (Panhandle Records, 2019)
- Henriette Renié Retrospective: Historical Harp Recordings 1927–1955 (MSR Classics, 2025)

== Books ==
- The Legend of Henriette Renié (editor, 2006)
- One Stone to the Building: Henriette Renié’s Life Through Her Works for Harp (2017)
