= Norman Carol =

American violinist (1928–2024)

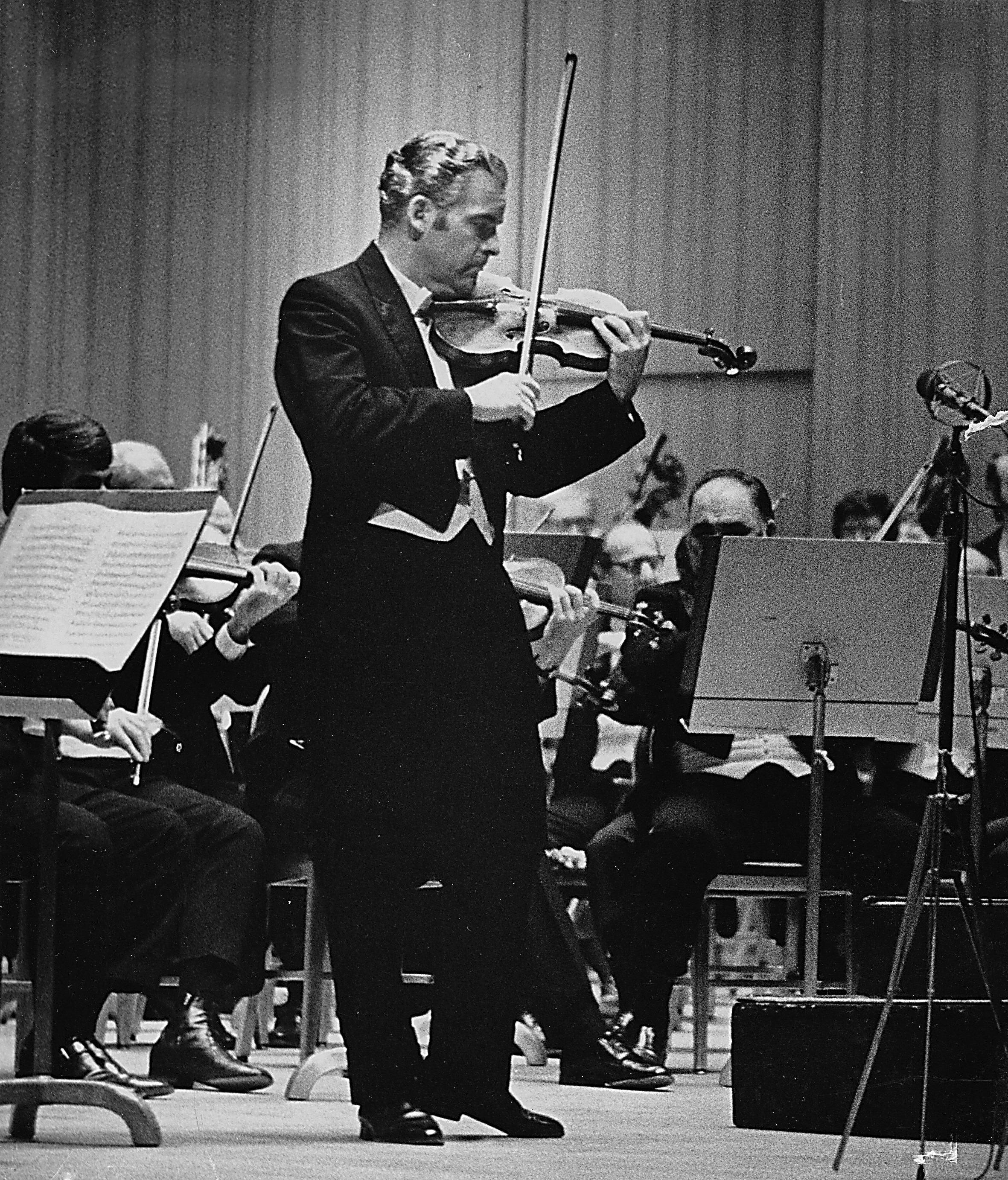
Norman Carol in concert with the Philadelphia Orchestra playing The Skrowaczewski Violin Concerto

Norman Carol (July 1, 1928 – April 28, 2024) was an American violinist. He was concertmaster of The Philadelphia Orchestra for 29 years with music directors Eugene Ormandy, Riccardo Muti, and Wolfgang Sawallisch. Stanisław Skrowaczewski's Violin Concerto was dedicated to and premiered by Carol with the Philadelphia Orchestra. Carol died on April 28, 2024, at the age of 95.

== Early life and education ==
Carol was born in Philadelphia, Pennsylvania, to Russian immigrants Anna and Max Carol. He began his violin studies with Sascha Jacobinoff at 6 years of age. Carol gave his first concert of a Mozart concerto at the age of 9. At the age of 13 he was accepted at the Curtis Institute of Music where he studied under Efrem Zimbalist. In 1946 and 1947, Carol was the concertmaster of the student orchestra at Tanglewood. While at Tanglewood, he was concertmaster when Leonard Bernstein conducted the American premiere of Benjamin Britten's Peter Grimes. Serge Koussevitzky was in the audience at a different concert and heard Carol play Édouard Lalo's Symphonie Espagnole and after the concert asked if he would join the Boston Symphony in the first violin section. Carol was 17 years old at the time.

== Career ==
Carol performed over the country billed as a child soloist. He recorded with Florence Weber on piano at age 9 in the studios of WIP-FM in Philadelphia. In May 1949, he was profiled in Time Magazine.

After three years with the Boston Symphony with Serge Koussevitzky and Charles Munch, Carol was drafted by the Army during the Korean war and served at the Presidio in San Francisco alongside other musicians including Andre Previn and Chet Baker in the 6th Army Band and played a solo for Arthur Fiedler and San Francisco Pops. After his discharge in 1955, Carol was hired by Alexander Hilsberg for the New Orleans Symphony Orchestra, in which he was concertmaster from 1956 to 1959. Norman also maintained an active career as soloist during this time. He met his wife while stationed there, and they married in 1952. He Recorded A Violin Recital, Norman Carol on RCA Victor. Carol was hired as concertmaster of the Minneapolis Symphony Orchestra by Antal Dorati in 1958 and from 1960 until 1965 continued in the post with Stanislaw Skrowaczewski as music director. Carol premiered Skrowaczewski's Violin Concerto in 1985.

In 1966, following the resignation of Anshel Brusilow, Carol joined the Philadelphia Orchestra by invitation of longtime conductor Eugene Ormandy to be his concertmaster. Carol remained in Philadelphia for 29 years, serving as concertmaster for Ormandy, Riccardo Muti and Wolfgang Sawallisch. Following a strike, Carol's first solo performance with the orchestra was of the Samuel Barber Violin Concerto, which was also the last concerto he was scheduled to perform before a lingering shoulder injury cut his orchestral career short in 1994. After a partially successful surgery three years prior, he played in pain, but kept it to himself until announcing his retirement plans at the start of the 1993–94 season. Upon his retirement, his concertmaster duties were temporarily assumed by associate concertmaster William DePasquale, who was a first desk violinist in the orchestra from 1963 to 2005 and Carol's stand partner for nearly three decades.

In 1973, Richard Nixon arranged for the orchestra to visit China. While in China, Norman conducted master classes and represented the orchestra to Madame Mao. During his tenure with the Philadelphia Orchestra, Carol also held a faculty appointment at his alma mater, the Curtis Institute of Music, for over 40 years. After his retirement from the orchestra, Carol continued to teach and performed and recorded with a chamber music ensemble, the Philadelphia Piano Quartet, for 11 years. The quartet included Toby Blumenthal on piano, former concertmaster Lamar Alsop (and the father of distinguished conductor Marin Alsop) on viola, and Bert Phillips on cello. Carol's instrument was Albert Spalding (violinist)'s Guarnerius 'del Gesu' violin, made in 1743. The violin was once used to premiere the Barber Violin Concerto, and Carol played on it in his first performance of the piece with the Philadelphia Orchestra.

== Discography ==
A Violin Recital, Norman Carol

- Format: LP
- Label: RCA Records
- Performers: Norman Carol
- Release date: 1954

Ein Heldenleben, op. 40.

- Format: LP
- Label: RCA Records
- Performers:Philadelphia Orchestra; Eugene Ormandy, conductor; Norman Carol, concertmaster
- Release date: 1980

Scheherazade: Symphonic suite, op. 35

- Format: LP
- Label: RCA Red Seal
- Performers: Philadelphia Orchestra; Eugene Ormandy, conductor; Norman Carol, concertmaster
- Tracks: The sea and Sinbad's ship (10:24) – The story of the Kalender prince (11:51) – The young prince and the young princess (11:35) – Festival at Bagdad; The sea and the ship goes to pieces on a rock surmounted by a bronze warrior; Conclusion (13:15).
- Release date: 1973
