= University of North Texas College of Music Opera =

UNT Opera Workshop, Murchison Performing Arts Center, University of North Texas College of Music (photo by Craig D. Blackmon, FAIA, courtesy of Holzman Moss Architecture)

The University of North Texas Opera, a.k.a. UNT Opera Workshop, is the student performing company of the Opera Studies Department of the Vocal Studies Division (one of eight divisions) of the University of North Texas College of Music.

== History ==
Founded in 1944 by the college's dean, Wilfred Bain, and a newly appointed artist-in-residence, Mary McCormic, the Opera Workshop has presented one or more operatic productions every semester since inception — fully mounted with orchestra, set, lighting, and costumes. Opera productions at the College of Music predate the founding of the Opera Workshop. In one notable instance, in 1938, North Texas produced Cynthia Parker, an opera by Julia Smith, who had graduated from North Texas in 1930.

== UNT College of Music divisions ==
Academic and Performance Divisions
Composition Studies	Conducting & Ensembles	Instrumental Studies	Jazz Studies	Keyboard Studies	Music Education	Music History, Theory and Ethnomusicology	Vocal Studies
Departments
	Choral; Conducting	Brass				Ethnomusicology	Opera; Studies
	Early; Music	Percussion				Music; History	Vocal; Studies
	Orchestral; Conducting	Strings				Music; Theory
	Wind; Conducting	Woodwinds

== Directors, Past & Present ==
1944–1960	Mary McCormic (1895–1981)
1960–1967	Eugene Conley (1908–1981)
1967–1970	Donald Kerne (1928–2000)
1970–1974	Arthur Paul Schoep, DMA (1920–2001) (hosted monthly Music of North Texas on KERA and WRR)
1974–1976	Jeannine Crader (born 1929)
1976–1980	Thomas Holliday (born 1945)
1981–1991	Dennis Wakeling (1939–1992) and Jeannine Crader (born 1929)
Spring 1992	Anthony Addison (born 1926)
Fall 1992–Spring 2017	Paula Homer (born 1953)
Fall 2017–present	Jonathan Eaton

== Notable people ==
Faculty

- Richard Croft
- Mary McCormic
- Richard Sparks

Alumni

- John Ardoin
- William Blankenship
- Latonia Moore
- Mark Nicolson
- Geeta Novotny
- Patricia Racette
- Julia Smith

== See also ==
- The Scarecrow (opera)
