= Anshel Brusilow =

American conductor and violinist

- Born: August 14, 1928; Philadelphia, Pennsylvania, United States
- Died: January 15, 2018 (aged 89); Dallas, Texas, United States
- Occupations: Conductor, violinist
- Known for: 1743 Guarneri del Gesu violin, known as "The Brusilow"

Anshel Brusilow (August 14, 1928 – January 15, 2018) was an American violinist, conductor, and music educator at the collegiate level.

== Family, education, and marriage ==
Brusilow parents, Leon Brusilow (Note: Leon Brusilow (1897–1968), father of Anshel Brusilow, is not the same person as Leon Brusiloff (1898–1973), longtime violinist and orchestra conductor. Anshel Brusilow's late brother, Nathan Brusilow (née Nachman Brusilow; 1920–2004), a longtime notable classical clarinetist from Philadelphia, is not the same person as Nathan Brusiloff (1904–1951) — Leon Brusiloff's brother and also a violinist.) (né Leiser Brusilovsky; born 1897 Kremenchug; naturalized 1927 ED Pa; died 1968) and Dora Brusilow (née Epstein; born 1902 Novorossiya; naturalized 1928 ED Pa; died 1977), married March 12, 1919. They immigrated to the United States, arriving with Anshel's brother, Nathan Brusilow (née Nachman Brusilow; 1920–2004), at the Port of New York July 22, 1922, aboard the SS Zeeland.

Brusilow was born in Philadelphia, Pennsylvania, in 1928. He began studying violin at the age of five with William Frederick Happich (1884–1959) and subsequently with Jani Szanto (1887–1977). Brusilow entered the Curtis Institute of Music when he was 11 and studied there with Efrem Zimbalist. Brusilow attended the Philadelphia Musical Academy and, at sixteen, was the youngest conducting student ever accepted by Pierre Monteux. A 4th-prize winner of the Jacques Thibaud-Marguerite Long Violin Competition in 1949, he performed as a soloist with numerous major orchestras in the United States.

Throughout most of his childhood and adolescence, he was known as Albert Brusilow. Later, at the urging of his girlfriend (who would later become his wife), he returned to using his birth name, Anshel. Brusilow married Marilyn Rae Dow on December 23, 1951, in San Francisco. They had three children.

== Career ==
=== Violinist ===
From 1954 to 1955, Brusilow was concertmaster and assistant conductor of the New Orleans Symphony under Alexander Hilsberg (1897–1961). (Note: Alexander Hilsberg (1897–1961) had been a violinist with the Philadelphia Orchestra from 1926 to 1951; from 1936 to 1951, under Eugene Ormandy, he was concertmaster.) From 1955 to 1959, he was associate concertmaster of the Cleveland Orchestra under George Szell. From 1959 to 1966, he was concertmaster of the Philadelphia Orchestra under Eugene Ormandy.

Acclaimed recordings featuring Brusilow with the Philadelphia Orchestra include Vivaldi's The Four Seasons, Rimsky-Korsakov's Scheherazade, and Strauss's Ein Heldenleben.

While serving as concertmaster of the Philadelphia Orchestra, Brusilow founded in 1961—and from 1961 to 1965 conducted—the Philadelphia Chamber Orchestra, an organization composed of musicians from the Philadelphia Orchestra. In December 1964, Brusilow announced his resignation as concertmaster of the Philadelphia Orchestra, effective June 1966, over a dispute with the Orchestra Association forbidding players from forming independent musical groups. (Note: Norman Carol replaced Brusilow as concertmaster of the Philadelphia Orchestra, effective August 1, 1966, and served in that role for 28 years (until 1994). Carol, like Brusilow, (a) was a native of Philadelphia, (b) was born in 1928, (c) had parents of Ukrainian descent, (d) studied violin with Efrem Zimbalist, (e) had been concertmaster of the New Orleans Symphony (f) began playing a 1743 Guarneri del Gesu violin, the "Spalding," when he became concertmaster of the Philadelphia Orchestra.)

=== Conductor ===
In 1965 Brusilow founded—and from 1965 to 1968 directed and conducted—the Chamber Symphony of Philadelphia. It performed two and one-half 34-week seasons and recorded six records on RCA Victor. In 1968, the Chamber Symphony folded under financial duress, attributed mostly to a lack of philanthropic support for a second orchestra in Philadelphia.

In 1970, Brusilow was appointed executive director and conductor of the Dallas Symphony Orchestra. He led the orchestra's first tours of Central and South America and started the pops series that the orchestra still performs to this day. The most notable recording from this period was Dallasound, a pops music album featuring several arrangements by Bill Holcombe. In 1973, after a successful tour of Central and South America, Brusilow was summarily fired after the symphony's board of directors came under censure when it became public that composers were paying to have their works performed.

He was the music director of the Richardson Symphony Orchestra in Richardson, Texas, from 1992 until his retirement from that position in 2012.

=== Educator ===
Brusilow was Director of Orchestral Studies at North Texas State University (later known as the University of North Texas) from 1973 to 1982, and again at North Texas from 1989 to 2008. Between 1982 and 1989 he held a similar post at Southern Methodist University in Dallas.

Brusilow retired from his professorship at North Texas in 2008. Shortly before his retirement, he conducted his final concert with the University of North Texas Symphony Orchestra, on Wednesday, April 23, 2008, in the Winspear Performance Hall of the Murchison Performing Arts Center in Denton. A $1,000,000 endowment, which includes the creation of a faculty position, the Anshel Brusilow Chair in Orchestral Studies, was established in his honor.

== Brusilow's violin and bows ==
Soon after becoming concertmaster of the Philadelphia Orchestra, Brusilow purchased a 1743 Guarneri del Gesu violin (Cozio 49626), which today is known as "The Brusilow". The violin, reportedly, was once owned by the French violinist, Jacques Pierre Rode (1774–1830), who had been a court violinist to Napoleon. The provenance also includes W.E. Hill & Sons; Arthur Beare (until 1929); Alfred Oppenheim Corbin (1874–1941); Leo Reisman, who purchased it through Emil Herrmann (from 1931); Theodore Pitcairn, a philanthropist who purchased it through Rembert Wurlitzer (around 1953); Brusilow (1959 to 1966), then to a previous owner (name unknown). Brusilow acquired the violin, through an arrangement, from Pitcairn, who, with Brusilow standing at his side at William Moennig & Son in Philadelphia, wrote a check for $28,000. Moennig, according to Brusilow, "threw in a Tourte bow for free", which Brusilow still owned in the late 1980s. Brusilow wrote in his 2015 book, Shoot The Conductor: Too Close to Monteux, Szell, and Ormandy, that he also owned a John Dodd bow, and preferred it over the Tourte.

== Diplomas, awards, and professional affiliations ==
- 1947: Artist's diploma, Philadelphia Musical Academy
- 1968: MusD, Capitol University
- (No date): National Patron, Delta Omicron, an international professional music fraternity
- 2015: Forward Indies (IndieFab Book of Year), Gold Winner for Performing Arts & Music, sponsored by Foreword Reviews, Inc., for Brusilow's memoir, Shoot the Conductor: Too Close to Monteux, Szell, and Ormandy, co-written with Robin Underdahl.

== See also ==
- University of North Texas Symphony Orchestra

Cultural offices
| Preceded by Jacob Morris Krachmalnick | Concertmasters, Philadelphia Orchestra; 1959–1966 | Succeeded by Norman Carol |
