= Exodus: An Oratorio in Three Parts =

Live album by William Shatner
- Released: April 15, 2008
- Recorded: April 9, 2005 – April 10, 2005
- Venue: Robinson Center, Little Rock, Arkansas
- Genre: Pop rock, classical, spoken word
- Length: 51:14
- Producer: David Itkin

William Shatner chronology
Has Been (2004)	Exodus: An Oratorio in Three Parts (2008)	Seeking Major Tom (2011)

Exodus: An Oratorio in Three Parts (2008) is the third album by William Shatner. It is a dramatic biblical reading in which he is accompanied by the Arkansas Symphony Orchestra. The recordings that were used to produce Exodus came from back-to-back evening performances by Shatner and the Arkansas Symphony Orchestra in April 2005. In addition to Shatner and the 75 member orchestra, a choral group of 350 singers accompanied the reading of Bible and Haggadah passages.

The album's music was written by David Itkin, and produced by Itkin, with executive producers Richard Foos and David McLees. Itkin was the Arkansas Symphony Orchestra's music director and conductor at the time of the album's recording. In an interview, Shatner recalled that Itkin invited him to perform as the piece's narrator.

The end of the album features Shatner reading the Priestly Blessing to an ovation from the audience. About this, Shatner said in an interview, "The magic of the CD is that you can hear the connection, especially at the end, between the audience and the actor."

The album was also released under the title Exodus, an oratorio in 3 parts for narrator, baritone & orchestra by Jewish Music Group.

== Track listing ==
All tracks composed by David Itkin and performed by William Shatner.

No.	Title	Length
1.	"Part 1. Moses and Pharaoh"	17:27
2.	"Part 2. Ten Plagues"	21:14
3.	"Part 3. Redemption"	12:33
