= Las Vegas Philharmonic Orchestra =

American symphony orchestra

Las Vegas Philharmonic
- Orchestra
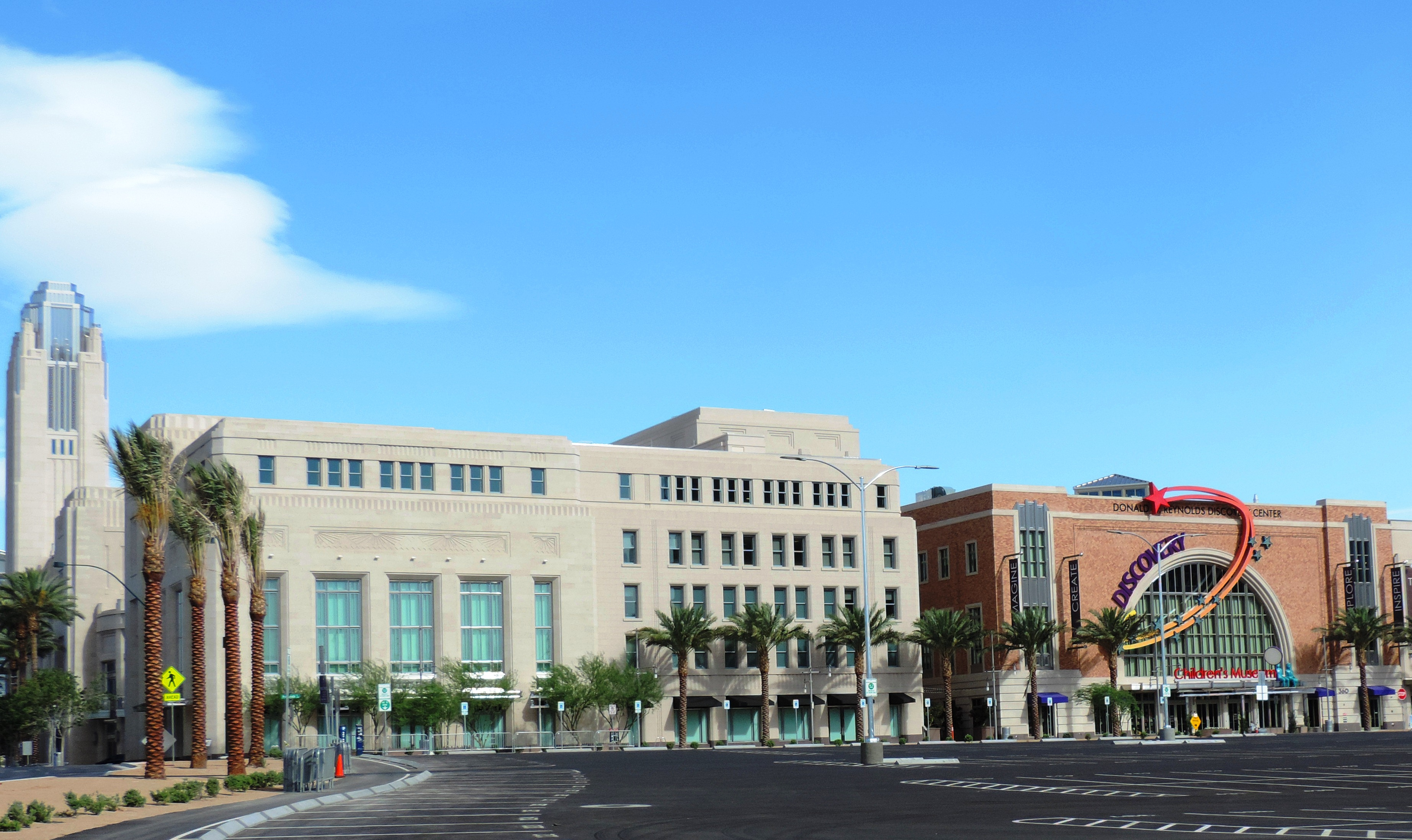
- The Smith Center for the Performing Arts in 2012
- Founded: 1998
- Location: Las Vegas, Nevada, U.S.
- Concert hall: Smith Center for the Performing Arts
- Music director: Rei Hotoda (designate, effective 2026)
- Website: lvphil.org

The Las Vegas Philharmonic is an American symphony orchestra, based in Las Vegas, Nevada. Sometimes referred to as the Las Vegas Philharmonic Orchestra, the orchestra is based at the Smith Center for the Performing Arts.

== History ==
With financial support from Las Vegas arts patrons and supporters Susan Tompkins and Andrew Tompkins, the orchestra was founded in 1998, with Harold Leighton Weller as the orchestra's first music director. The orchestra gave its initial performances at the Artemus W. Ham Concert Hall on the campus of the University of Nevada, Las Vegas. Weller held the post until 2007, and subsequently took the title of conductor laureate with the orchestra.

David Itkin was the second music director of the orchestra, from 2007 to 2012. The orchestra moved to the Smith Center for the Performing Arts in 2012. In May 2012, Itkin had notified the orchestra's board of directors of his intention to conclude his tenure in 2013, citing "artistic differences and an absence of institutional transparency" as reasons for his departure. The orchestra's board of directors subsequently acted in early June 2012 to grant his request to conclude his tenure in 2013, and subsequently in August 2012 to end his affiliation with the orchestra with immediate effect.

In January 2014, Donato Cabrera first guest-conducted the orchestra. Based on this appearance, in April 2014, the orchestra named Cabrera as its next music director, effective with the 2014–2015 season. Cabrera held the post through the 2023–2024 season. Following the departure of Cabrera as music director, the orchestra named Leonard Slatkin as its music consultant, for a scheduled term of two years.

In May 2025, Rei Hotoda first guest-conducted the orchestra. Based on this appearance, in November 2025, the orchestra announced the appointment of Hotoda as its next music director, effective in July 2026, with an initial contract of four years. Hotoda is the first female conductor to be named music director of the Las Vegas Philharmonic.

== Music directors ==
- Harold Leighton Weller (1998–2007)
- David Itkin (2007–2012)
- Donato Cabrera (2014–2024)
- Rei Hotoda (designate, effective July 2026)
