= John Allred =

John Allred may refer to:

- John Allred (American football) (born 1974), American football tight end
- John Allred (musician) (born 1962), American jazz trombonist
