= Matteson-Phillips Tubajazz Consort =

American low-brass jazz ensemble

Matteson-Phillips Tubajazz Consort is a US big band scored for low brass instruments – euphoniums, and tubas – performed by artists who are renowned in jazz or classical or both.

== History ==
The group was formed in 1975 by Rich Matteson and Harvey Phillips as a way to make a unique contribution to the First International Brass Congress in Montreux, Switzerland, the following year. Other members included Ashley Alexander (euphonium, double bell euphonium), Steve Harlos (piano), Jack Petersen (guitar), John Marcellus ( euphonium), R. Winston Morris (tuba), and Daniel Perantoni (tuba). The band played at the Adelaide Festival in Australia in February 1978 and at other venues in Australia, including the Sydney Opera House. They set attendance records at The Basement, a Sydney jazz club.

Tubajazz is a trademark of the Harvey Phillips Foundation, Inc., a New York not-for-profit corporation founded by Harvey Phillips in 1977 and is based in Bloomington, IN. The trademark was registered November 19, 1996, at the US Patent and Trademark Office.

== Artists ==
- Euphonium: Rich Matteson, Ashley Alexander, John Allred, Buddy Baker, John Marcellus
- Tuba: Harvey Phillips, Daniel Perantoni, R. Winston Morris
- Piano: Tommy Ferguson, Dan Haerle, Steve Harlos, Frank Mantooth
- Guitar: Jack Petersen
- Jazz Bass: Lou Fischer, Billy Michaels, Rufus Reid, Kelly Sill
- Drums: Steve Houghton, Rick Kirkland, Ed Soph

== Composers and arrangers ==
- Rich Matteson
- Phil Wilson
- John Allred
- Dan Haerle (piano)
- Jack Petersen

== Discography ==
- The Matteson-Phillips Tubajazz Consort (Tubajazz Records, 1976)
- Perantoni Plays Perantoni (Mark Records, 1979)
- Tubajazz Superhorns Live! (Tubajazz Records, 1991, released on CD by HPF Records 1992)
- Super Horn (rec. 1978 Australia) (Mark Records, 1982, released as compilation CD along with debut album as Tubajazz Superhorns, HPF Records 1992)
