= River Douglas =

River Douglas may refer to:

- River Douglas, Lancashire
- River Douglas, Isle of Man

== See also ==
- Douglas Water (disambiguation)
