= Jack Petersen (guitarist) =

American jazz guitarist and educator (born 1933)

- Born: Jack Leroy Petersen; October 25, 1933; Elk City, Oklahoma, U.S.
- Died: February 5, 2026 (aged 92) Jacksonville, Florida, U.S.
- Genres: Jazz
- Occupations: Musician, composer, educator
- Instrument: Guitar

Jack Leroy Petersen was an American jazz guitarist and educator. He was a pedagogical architect for jazz guitar and jazz improvisation at Berklee College of Music, University of North Texas College of Music, and University of North Florida.

== Biography ==
His father, Harold Petersen, worked for LTV and his mother, Effie, worked at Russel-Newman Manufacturing Company. When Jack Petersen was five years old, his family moved to Denton, Texas. He began playing guitar when he was 16 under the influence of Western swing.

He won a course in guitar from a radio contest. The teacher was Bob Hames, a former soldier who was attending University of North Texas. Hames introduced Petersen the music of Charlie Christian, Herb Ellis, Tal Farlow, Barry Galbraith, Barney Kessel, Carl Kress, Oscar Moore, Remo Palmieri, Chuck Wayne. While in high school he and his friend Dick Crockett listened to North Texas Lab Bands and the small groups that performed on campus, and developed their playing style. Petersen graduated from Denton High School 1951.

In 1955, he enlisted in the Army to perform with the 8th US Army Band in Seoul, Korea. While in Seoul, Petersen met many musicians and played eleven gigs a week. After leaving the Army, he attended the University of North Texas to study music. He played cello and double bass in the orchestra and guitar and piano in the jazz ensemble where he collaborated with faculty members Gene Hall and Floyd Graham.

In 1957 Petersen joined the Hal McIntyre Orchestra on September 8, 1957, in Knoxville, Tennessee, for its European tour. In 1958 Petersen was a Dallas studio musician recording jingles, first as a guitarist and sometimes pianist, then as producer, composer. Much of the work was making IDs for radio stations all over the country. Petersen once remarked in an interview that people don't realize the work that goes into it — "In 20 seconds, you've got to write a whole symphony". Petersen was proficient on double bass, cello, and piano. This gave him sight-reading skills, an advantage for guitarists of the day who were earning money in recording studios and dance orchestras. Sight-reading and maneuvering jazz progressions (beyond blues, pentatonic, and classic rock) made him a popular guitarist in recording studios, with big bands, and musicians who had little time to teach parts to their sidemen.

A prominent educator Gene Hall hired Petersen to teach with him at Stan Kenton Band Clinics in 1960. As of 1977, Petersen had been with Stan Kenton Band Clinics for some 17 years. In 1962 Lawrence Berk, Berklee, discovered Petersen though his affiliation with Stan Kenton Band Clinics and had Petersen design and chair the first formal guitar curriculum at Berklee College of Music. In 1965 left Berklee to return to studio work and performance opportunities in Dallas. In 1973 Leon Breeden invited Petersen to develop the jazz guitar program at North Texas. Petersen, with jazz pianist Dan Haerle, helped lead a jazz improv curriculum that Rich Matteson had revamped. Later Rich Matteson hired Petersen, his longtime colleague, to build a jazz guitar program. Rich Matteson, who had been teaching jazz at the University of North Texas for 13 years, was hired in 1986 by the University of North Florida to build a program focusing on jazz. Petersen taught at UNF as resident artist and associate professor until his retirement in 1995, retiring fully in 1999. In 2003 Petersen moved to Prescott, Arizona, and performed as guest and clinician around the country.

As an arranger Petersen, along with Rich Matteson and Phil Wilson, founded the music publishing company Outrageous Mother, a Texas corporation, to distribute their arrangements. Petersen has also authored numerous instructional books for Mel Bay and other music publishing companies.

== Career ==
- 1957: Hal McIntyre Orchestra
- 1958-1962: Studio Musician in Dallas
- 1960-1977: Stan Kenton Band Clinician with Gene Hall
- 1962-1965: Berklee College of Music, First Chair of the Guitar Department
- 1965: Studio Musician and Performing Artist in Dallas
- 1974-1979: University of North Texas College of Music, First Chair of Guitar Department
- 1974: Outrageous Mother Publishing Company
- 1988: University of North Florida, Resident Artist and Associate Professor
- 2003: Touring Guitar Clinician

He has worked with Dave Brubeck, Randy Brecker, Dallas Symphony Orchestra, Buddy DeFranco, Herb Ellis, Fort Worth Symphony Orchestra, Milt Hinton, Lena Horne, Stan Kenton, Peggy Lee, Michel Legrand, Henry Mancini, Lou Marini, Ellis Marsalis Jr., Rich Matteson, Matteson-Phillips Tubajazz Consort, Rufus Reid, Doc Severinsen, Billy Taylor, Clark Terry, and Nancy Wilson.

His students include John Abercrombie, Morris Acevedo, James Chirillo, Corey Christiansen, Vincent Gardner, Mick Goodrick, Jerry McGeorge, Marcus Printup, Richard Smith, John Tropea, Cynthia Nielsen, Clint Strong, Rick Peckham, Bruce Saunders,

== Guitar l, and Kevin Balesb innovation ==
While at Berklee, Petersen introduced a guitar lab concept that transformed guitar education, particularly jazz guitar, with respect to sight reading and with respect to accommodating large numbers of guitar students. He created a big band composed of 12 guitars in three units of four – one unit would cover the woodwinds of a big band, one would cover the trombones, and one would cover the trumpets. The guitar players read single notes, just like horn players — no chords. Later, Petersen helped his colleague at North Texas, Rich Matteson, develop a similar concept for low brass, creating a big band composed solely of low brass instruments. The Matteson-Phillips Tubajazz Consort was composed mostly of renowned professional artists and educators.

== Discography ==
- The Five Strings (December 16, 1954)
- Rich Matteson Sextet, Pardon Our Dust, We're Making Changes, John Allred (musician), Shelly Berg, Jack Petersen, Lou Fischer, Louie Bellson; Four Leaf Clover (FLC CD 131) (1990)
- Dallas Jazz Orchestra, Hey Man! (1975)
- Phil Wilson & Rich Matteson, The Sound of the Wasp (1975)
- Phil Wilson, Live and Cookin'
- Matteson-Phillips Tubajazz Consort, Mark Records (1978)
- Matteson-Phillips Tubajazz Consort, Superhorn (1981)
- Phil Wilson, Groovey (1981)
- North Texas State University, The NTSU Jazz Guitars (May 1983)
- Jamey Aebersold, Rhythm Section "Work-Out": Volume 30A & 30B, JA Records (1984)
- Diane Linscott, Singin' Around (2000)
- Diane Linscott, Alone/Together (2002)

== Compositions and arrangements ==
- 1981: Up Tight (BMI)
- 1995: Magic of Brazil (BMI)
- 1999: Hey Man
- 2002: Denton Blues
- Scrapbook, Dallas Jazz Orchestra, Jazz Mark

== Publications ==
- c1979: Jack Petersen, Jazz styles & analysis, guitar: a history of the jazz guitar via recorded solos, transcribed and annotated, Vols. I & II, Maher Publications
- 1980: Jack Petersen, "Django Reinhardt's Guitar in 'Festival 48'", Down Beat Music '80, p. 52-53
- 1981: Jack Petersen & Rich Matteson, Up Tight
- 1981: Rich Matteson & Jack Petersen, Art of melodic motion: an improvisational study
- c1983: Dan Haerle, Jack Petersen, Rich Matteson, Jazz Tunes for Improvisation: A Graduated course of study for the jazz musician, Alfred Publishing
- 1995: Rich Matteson, Jack Petersen, Music Minus One: The Art of Improvisation, Vol. 1, Music Minus One
- 1995: Jack Petersen, Magic of Brazil
- 2002: Jack Petersen, Beginning Guitar: Mastering the Keys: The Jack Petersen Guitar Series, Mel Bay
- 2003: Jack Petersen, Chords Galore: A Systematic Approach to Voicing Chords on Guitar, Mel Bay
- 2009: Jack Petersen, Beginning Guitar: Essential Etudes, Mel Bay
- 2010: Jack Petersen, American Patriotic Guitar Ensembles, Mel Bay

== See also ==
- One O'Clock Lab Band
