= Harold Leighton Weller =

American conductor and music educator (born 1941)

Harold "Hal" Leighton Weller (born July 6, 1941) is an American conductor and music educator.

Weller was born in Dayton, Ohio and graduated from Belmont High School in 1959. He earned degrees from Miami University and Ohio State University in Trumpet and Music History with additional studies at the National Music Camp (Interlochen, Michigan), Oberlin Conservatory of Music and Cincinnati Conservatory of Music.

== Teachers ==
Formal Conducting studies and mentors include Orien Dalley, and A. Clyde Roller (Interlochen); Robert Fountain, and David Robertson (Oberlin); Haig Yaghjian (Cincinnati Conservatory) and Richard Lert (1964, 1965, 1967; American Symphony Orchestra League; Conductor Institute). Trumpet teachers and mentors include Paul Blagg (Dayton Philharmonic); Louis Davidson (Oberlin); and Eugene Blee (Cincinnati Symphony).

== Credits ==
He conducted Cincinnati Conservatory Opera Productions (1961–1963); served as associate conductor, Hamilton Symphony Orchestra (1962–1964); music director, Hamilton Symphony Orchestra (1964–1970); founding music director, Ashland (Oh) Symphony Orchestra (1970–1977); founding music director, Old Dominion University Symphony Orchestra (1977–1979); assistant conductor, New Mexico Symphony (1979–1982); musical director, Flagstaff Symphony Orchestra (1982–1997); visiting professor of music, University of Nevada, Las Vegas (1997–1998); and was the founding music director, Las Vegas Philharmonic (1998–2007). Honorary Titles include "conductor laureate" for Flagstaff Symphony Orchestra (title conferred June, 1997); founding music director and conductor laureate, Las Vegas Philharmonic (title conferred June, 2007), and "music director laureate", Ashland Symphony Orchestra (title conferred October 26, 2019).

== Awards ==
Among Weller's numerous accolades include Flagstaff's Citizen of the Year, 1990 (Presented by the Arizona Daily Sun); Asteroid Weller, named in honor of Harold Weller, Lowell Observatory, Flagstaff, Arizona on October 19, 1994; Gold Baton Award, The Flagstaff Symphony Association, April, 1997; Community Achievement Award in Arts & Entertainment Award, 2003 (Las Vegas Chamber of Commerce); Harold Weller Day proclaimed by Mayor of the City of Las Vegas, Oscar Goodman, October 9, 2005; Harold Leighton Weller Day proclaimed by the mayor of the City of Las Vegas, Oscar Goodman, June 30, 2007.

== Personal life ==
Weller currently resides in Las Vegas and is very active with his foundation to Assist Young Musicians ("FAYM"). Relatives include wife: Elizabeth Ann (Welch) Weller (b. May 21, 1945); and Sons: Kurt Eugene Weller (b. August 14, 1967); Christopher Howard Weller (b. December 1, 1969).
