= Henry Price (tenor) =

American tenor

Henry Price III (born October 18, 1945, in Oakland, California) is a well-known American operatic tenor, who was a pupil of the tenor Eugene Conley. He made his formal debut with the Goldovsky Opera Theater in 1970, as Alfredo Germont in La traviata.

== Career ==
In 1973, under the auspices of the Metropolitan Opera, he sang St Chavez in the company premiere (directed by Alvin Alley) of Four Saints in Three Acts (opposite Barbara Hendricks, also in her Met debut), at the Vivian Beaumont Theater, Forum. In the fall of 1975, he first appeared at the New York City Opera, in La traviata, with Maralin Niska in the title role. Through 1980, he was seen with that company in H.M.S. Pinafore, Lucrezia Borgia (opposite Beverly Sills and Susanne Marsee, in Tito Capobianco's production), La belle Hélène (as Pâris, with Karan Armstrong), Il barbiere di Siviglia, Die Fledermaus (as Alfred), Manon, Die Zauberflöte, The Pirates of Penzance, Die lustige Witwe (as Camille de Rosillon), Il turco in Italia, The Student Prince, and Les contes d'Hoffmann (with Justino Díaz as the Villains). He later returned to the City Opera for Prince Félix Youssoupov in the world premiere of Jay Reise's Rasputin (directed by Frank Corsaro, 1988).

Dr. Price appeared with opera companies throughout North America, and, from 1982 to 1988, was resident tenor with the state operas in Mainz, Germany, and Linz, Austria. In 1993, he joined the faculty of Pepperdine University in Malibu, California, where he was Professor of Voice and Opera until his retirement in 2018.

The singing-actor is perhaps best known for his national telecasts opposite Sills: La traviata (from Wolf Trap Opera Company, 1976), Il barbiere di Siviglia (City Opera, 1976), Manon (City Opera, 1977) and Il turco in Italia (City Opera, 1978). Their EMI recording of Die lustige Witwe (in English translation, 1978) won a Grammy Award. In 1978, he also appeared in the televised Vanessa (with Johanna Meier in the name part and Christopher Keene conducting), from the Spoleto Festival USA.

== Discography ==
- Donizetti: Lucrezia Borgia (Sills, Marsee, Fazah; Rudel, 1976) [live] Opera Depot
- Lehár: Die lustige Witwe: excerpts (Sills, Titus; Rudel, 1978) EMI

== Videography ==
- Verdi: La traviata (Sills, Fredricks; Rudel, Capobianco, 1976) [live] VAI
- Rossini: Il barbiere di Siviglia (Sills, Titus, Gramm, Ramey; Caldwell, Caldwell, 1976) [live] Paramount
- Massenet: Manon (Sills, Fredricks, Ramey; Rudel, Capobianco, 1977) [live] Paramount
