= Leonard Candelaria =

Leonard Candelaria (born 1947) is an American trumpeter and educator residing in Birmingham, Alabama. Until Fall 2009, he served as Professor of Trumpet and Artist in Residence at the University of Alabama at Birmingham (UAB). Prior to his appointment at UAB, Leonard was, for 28 years (beginning fall 1974), professor of trumpet at the University of North Texas College of Music, where he was eventually named Regents Professor of Music in the College of Music. He is recognized internationally as a teacher and performer, and has been a featured soloist in numerous concerts all over the world. He has often been praised for his high level of musicianship and artistry.

Candelaria has performed and recorded with the Dallas Symphony, and has also performed with numerous other orchestras, including the Texas Baroque Ensemble, the Fort Worth Symphony, the Dallas Bach Society, and many others. He received academic degrees from the University of North Texas (Bachelor of Music cum laude, 1972 and Master of Music Education, 1974) and Northwestern University (Doctor of Music - Trumpet Performance, 1985), studying with teachers such as John J. Haynie, Robert H. Fleming, Vincent Cichowicz and others. While studying at the University of North Texas, Candelaria was a member of the world-famous One O'clock Lab Band.

== Success as an educator ==
Many of Candelaria's students have had successful careers in bands and symphony orchestras throughout the world. His students have been members of the jazz bands of Buddy Rich, Stan Kenton, and Maynard Ferguson, and in numerous major orchestras, including the Dallas Symphony, the Baltimore Symphony, the National Symphony and others. Also, a number of Candelaria's former students have been successful in service bands, while others have achieved winning status in prominent national and international competitions. In 1993, Leonard received the Shelton Excellence in Teaching Award at the University of North Texas.

== Participation in professional trumpeters' organizations ==
From 1993 to 1995, Candelaria served as President of the International Trumpet Guild (ITG), an association of trumpeters totaling approximately 7,100 members from more than 60 countries. Today, he continues to be a member of the ITG Board of Directors and is Chair of the Carmine Caruso International Jazz Trumpet Solo Competition. In November 2004, Candelaria organized and coordinated the Ellsworth Smith International Trumpet Solo Competition at the University of Alabama at Birmingham, an event which was co-sponsored by ITG and the Columbus Foundation.

== Selected discography ==
As conductor

- CDCM Computer Music Series Vol 9-musics, Metaphors, Machines Centaur Records (1993)

Composers: Larry Austin, Robert Keefe, Cindy McTee, James Piekarsky, Rowell Rogers, Phil Winsor, Rodney II Waschka
Performers: Takehisa Kosugi, Martin Kalve, John Cage, David Tudor, Catherine Holm, Robert McCormick, George Dmitri
Conductor: Leonard Candelaria
Orchestra/Ensemble: North Texas University Trumpet Ensemble

1) Beachcombers, Larry Austin (1991)

Performer: Takehisa Kosugi (Violin), Martin Kalve (Cheng), John Cage (Voice), David Tudor (Electronics)
Notes: This work consists of four excerpts from "Coast Zone," a 1983 commission for Merce Cunningham

2) The Ephemerides by Robert Keefe (1990)

Performer: Catherine Holm (Harp), Robert McCormick (Percussion)

3) Metal Music, by Cindy McTee (1989)

4) Dreamfile, by James Piekarsky (1991)

5) Cenotaph, by Rowell Rogers (1990)

6) Anamorphoses, by Phil Winsor (1990)

Conductor: Leonard Candelaria
Orchestra/Ensemble: North Texas University Trumpet Ensemble

7) A noite, porém, rangeu e quebrou, by Rodney II Waschka (1989)

Performer: George Dmitri (Double Bass)
