= Cindy McTee =

American composer and educator (born 1953)

Cindy McTee (born February 20, 1953) is an American composer and educator.

== Early life and education ==
McTee was born in Tacoma, Washington. She studied at Pacific Lutheran University, the Academy of Music in Kraków, Yale University, and the University of Iowa. Her teachers included Krzysztof Penderecki, Bruce MacCombie, and Jacob Druckman.

== Teaching experience ==
McTee taught at Pacific Lutheran University for three years before joining the faculty of the University of North Texas College of Music in 1984, where she received a promotion to Full Professor in 1995 and to Regents Professor in 2000. In 2009, she was designated a Fellow in UNT's Institute for the Advancement of the Arts. She also participated in leadership roles at UNT, most notably as Chair of the Division of Composition Studies for a total of five years ending in 2000. In 2010, she retired from the University of North Texas as Regents Professor Emeritus.

== Major awards ==
McTee has received two awards from the American Academy of Arts and Letters (1992) (2002), a fellowship from the John Simon Guggenheim Memorial Foundation (2001), a Fulbright Fellowship (1990), and a composer fellowship from the National Endowment for the Arts (1994). She won the Louisville Orchestra Composition Competition (2001) and the Detroit Symphony Orchestra's third annual Elaine Lebenbom Memorial Award (2009). She also received a Music Alive Award from Meet the Composer (2002) and a BMI (Broadcast Music Incorporated) Student Composers Award (1977).

== Personal life ==
McTee married the conductor Leonard Slatkin on 20 November 2011.

== Performances ==
- Amarillo Symphony
- American Composers Orchestra
- Aspen Festival Orchestra
- Bands of America
- Buffalo Philharmonic
- Chicago Symphony Orchestra
- Cleveland Orchestra
- Colorado Symphony Orchestra
- Columbus Symphony Orchestra
- Dallas Symphony Orchestra
- Dallas Wind Symphony
- Detroit Symphony Orchestra
- Flagstaff Symphony Orchestra
- Houston Symphony Orchestra
- Indianapolis Symphony Orchestra
- Lone Star Wind Orchestra
- Los Angeles Philharmonic
- Nashville Symphony
- National Symphony Orchestra
- New World Symphony (orchestra)
- NHK Symphony Orchestra
- North Texas Wind Symphony
- Omaha Symphony Orchestra
- Orchestre National de Lyon
- Pacific Symphony
- Philharmonia Orchestra
- Pittsburgh New Music Ensemble
- Pittsburgh Symphony Orchestra
- Puerto Rico Symphony Orchestra
- Rochester Philharmonic Orchestra
- Saint Louis Symphony Orchestra
- San Antonio Symphony Orchestra
- Seattle Symphony Orchestra
- Springfield Symphony Orchestra
- Sydney Symphony Orchestra
- The United States Army Field Band
- United States Marine Band
- Voices of Change
- Yale Concert Band

== Major works ==
- Double Play, for wind ensemble (2011)
- Double Play, for orchestra (2010)
- Tempus Fugit, for orchestra (2010)
- The Unquestioned Answer, for orchestra (2009)
- Bricolage, for flute and computer music on CD (2008)
- Solstice, concerto for trombone and orchestra (2007)
- Fanfare for Trombones (2007)
- Finish Line, for wind symphony (2006)
- Finish Line, for orchestra (2005)
- Einstein's Dream, for string orchestra, percussion, and computer music on CD (2004)
- Fanfare for Trumpets (2004)
- Ballet for Band (2004)
- Adagio, for string quartet (2003)
- Adagio, for string orchestra (2002)
- Symphony No. 1: Ballet for Orchestra (2002)
- Timepiece, for wind symphony (2001)
- Timepiece, for orchestra (2000)
- Agnus Dei, for organ (1998)
- Changes, for cello and bass (1996)
- Soundings, for band (1995)
- Stepping Out, for flute and percussion (1993)
- Capriccio per Krzysztof Penderecki, for violin (1993)
- California Counterpoint: The Twittering Machine, for wind ensemble (1993)
- The Twittering Machine, for chamber orchestra (1993)
- Circle Music V for trombone and tape (1992)
- "M" Music, for computer music on CD (1992)
- Circuits, for wind ensemble (1990)
- Circuits, for orchestra (1990)
- Metal Music, for computer music on CD (1989)
- Circle Music I for viola and piano (1988)
- Circle Music II for flute and piano (1988)
- Circle Music III for bassoon and piano (1988)
- Circle Music IV for horn and piano (1988)
- Psalm 100, for choir (1982)
- Chord, for flute (1977)
