= Bob Hames =

- Birth name: Robert Earl Hames
- Also known as: Bob Hames
- Genres: Jazz
- Occupation: Musician
- Instrument: Guitar

Robert Earl Hames (January 22, 1920 – September 6, 1998) was an American jazz guitarist from Texas who played with the dance orchestras of Jan Garber, Orrin Tucker, and Stan Keller. In the early 1950s he was a staff guitarist for live productions at WFAA-TV, a Dallas–Fort Worth broadcaster. Down Beat magazine rated Hames as one of the top ten guitarists in the US.

In the mid-1940s Hames was a member of the Jan Garber Orchestra and the Orrin Tucker band before enrolling at the University of North Texas. In 1945 he enrolled at the University of North Texas College of Music. While there, he played electric guitar in 1945 with the Aces of Collegeland, the forerunner to the One O'Clock Lab Band. He also taught guitar on and off campus. One of his high-school students, Jack Petersen, went on to become a well-known jazz educator and jazz guitarist. Hames introduced Petersen to jazz recordings of Karl Kress, Tal Farlow, Chuck Wayne, Herb Ellis (then a student at North Texas), Barney Kessel, Barry Galbraith, Remo Palmieri, Oscar Moore, and Charlie Christian.

While a student at North Texas in 1946, Hames was one of eight student musicians from North Texas to guest star on Interstate's weekly musical radio show, 3:30, Sunday, April 14, 1946, aired on WFAA. Betty Cooper (vocalist) featured with the Blue Notes, a quartet composed of Lynn McClain, June Heitt, Bonnye Williams, and Elsie Mae Cooper. Bob Hames (electric guitar), Jim Bob Floyd (piano), and Bill Meeks (clarinet) were featured as a trio. Hames was a guitarist on the Jerry Haynes Show on WFAA TV in the mid-1950s, which aired Monday through Friday at noon.

Hames also had a music store in Greenville, Texas, on Washington Street. He died in Texas in 1998.

== Selected compositions ==
Music and lyrics by Bob Hames except where noted

- "Lonely Vagabond" by Bob Hames and David Chenault (written 1947) (1983)
- "I Didn't Know My Heart Could Fly" (1972)
- "Happiness is Loving You" (1981)
- "Tell Me a Story" (written Aug 1972) (1981)
- "Bar Whiskey Fool" (written June 1975) (1981)
- "Just a Step Away" (written 1979) (1981)
- "Lovers Waltz" ("A Million Dreams From Now") (The Young and the Restless episode 7512) (1983)
- "Wasted Love" (1983)
- "Have You Ever Heard (a Lonely Heart Cry)?" (key of C) (1983)
- "My Blue-Eyed Girl" by Bob Hames and Frank J. Milton (1983)
- "Come Back My Love" (1984)
- "Whistle Britches" (1988)
- "'Til the Day You Passed Me By" (1989)
- "After You Know It All" (1990)
- "There Goes My Heartache" (1990)
- "Are the Kids Still Cruising Main?" (1991)
- "I Just Laughed 'Til I Cried" (1991)
- "You Are My Rainbow" (1991)
- "Your Next Stepping Stone" (1993)
- "If You Don't Have a Heart (Please Don't Steal Mine)" (1997)
- "Jackhammer Boogie" (1997)

== Family ==
Robert Earl Hames was married twice. On December 31, 1942, he married Billye Mildred Goin (August 24, 1921, Bailey, Texas – January 11, 1972, buried Mount Carmel Cemetery, Wolfe City, Texas). Bob and Billye had a son. On August 30, 1975, he married Helen Juanita Bullard (August 30, 1928 – March 4, 1993) in Tarrant County, Texas. Helen had three daughters and a son by a prior marriage.
