= William Blankenship =

American opera singer

- Born: March 7, 1928; Gatesville, Texas
- Died: December 2, 2017 (aged 89); Vienna, Austria

William Leonard Blankenship (7 March 1928 – 2 December 2017) was an American operatic tenor, music pedagogue at the collegiate level, stage and television actor, and stage director.

== Biography ==
In Europe, Blankenship sang roles at the opera houses in Vienna (Vienna Volksoper & Vienna State Opera), Stuttgart, Hamburg, Braunschweig (1957–60), Bern (1960), Mannheim, Braunschweig, Munich (from 1965), Bern, Klagenfurt (1956 European debut), Bregenz (1972 as Phoebus in The Fairy-Queen by Henry Purcell). In the United States, he sang with the Santa Fe Opera, San Antonio, San Diego (1968), Dallas Opera, and Houston Grand Opera. He has sung in international festivals in Moscow, Salzburg, Vienna, Munich, and Rio de Janeiro. He performed concerts with major orchestras on radio and television.

== Selected discography ==
- Giuseppe Verdi: Otello, re-released by Arthaus Musik (in mono) (2010) (OCLC 647746796)

Singers: Adolf Dallapozza, Willy Ferenz, Margarita Lilova, Leo Heppe, Norman Mittelmann, Walter Kreppel, Wolfgang Windgassen, William Blankenship, Sena Jurinac
Conductor: Argeo Quadri
Orchestras: Vienna State Opera Chorus, South German Radio Symphony Orchestra, Vienna Boys' Choir

- Ernst Krenek, Jonny spielt auf (Jonny Strikes Up)

LP – Amadeo AVRS 5038, Philips SAL 3498 (1965) (LCCN 98-708397); Amadeo AVRS 13 257
CD (re-release) Vanguard Classics (1994)
William Blankenship (Max), Evelyn Lear (Anita), Gerd Feldhoff (Jonny), Thomas Stewart (Daniello), Lucia Popp (Yvonne)
Vienna Volksoper Orchestra, Vienna Academy Chamber Choir, Heinrich Hollreiser, conductor

- Othmar Schoeck, Penthesilea BASF Harmonia Mundi 49 22485-6 (1975) (LCCN 77-762256)

Hana Janku, Barbara Scherler, sopranos; Carl Smith, mezzo-soprano; Raili Kostia, contralto; William Blankenship, tenor; Roland Hermann, Kurt Widmer, baritones; supporting soloists; Choir of North German Radio Hamburg; Kölner Rundfunkchor; Kölner Rundfunk-Sinfonie-Orchester; Zdeněk Mácal, conductor

== Education ==
After a year at the University of Texas at Austin, Blankenship, in 1947, won a three-year scholarship to study with Mary McCormic at the University of North Texas College of Music, where in 1950 he earned a Bachelor of Music degree. While an undergraduate at North Texas, he sang major opera roles with the school's Opera Workshop directed by Mary McCormic. After three years in the Air Force (1950–1953), he attended the Juilliard School (1953–1955), studying voice with Mack Harrell and Povla Frijsh.

In 1954, Blankenship was selected by Mary Garden for the National Arts Foundation's operatic fellowship, which included a $1,200 stipend and promise of engagements in leading opera houses of France and Italy. Garden, who had auditioned 300 young American singers said that Blankenship was the finest tenor voice she had heard in America. The fellowship included a tour of study at the Vienna Academy of Music from 1955 to 1956, where he earned an opera diploma.

In 1971, the University of North Texas honored Blankenship as a "Distinguished Graduate."

== Family ==
William Blankenship, in 1952, married Barbara Estelle Connally (maiden; 1930–1997). They had four children:

1. Beverly Elizabeth Blankenship (born 1952), stage and opera director
2. Rebecca Blankenship (born 1954), an operatic soprano
3. Todd Lawrence Blankenship (born 1955)
4. John Blankenship (born 1951)

William Blankenship died December 2, 2017, in Vienna. When he died, he had been married to Sawako Yamada, a pianist. Blankenship was cremated at Feuerhalle Simmering and his ashes are buried there.
