= Eugene Conley =

American opera singer

Eugene Conley (photo with dedication)

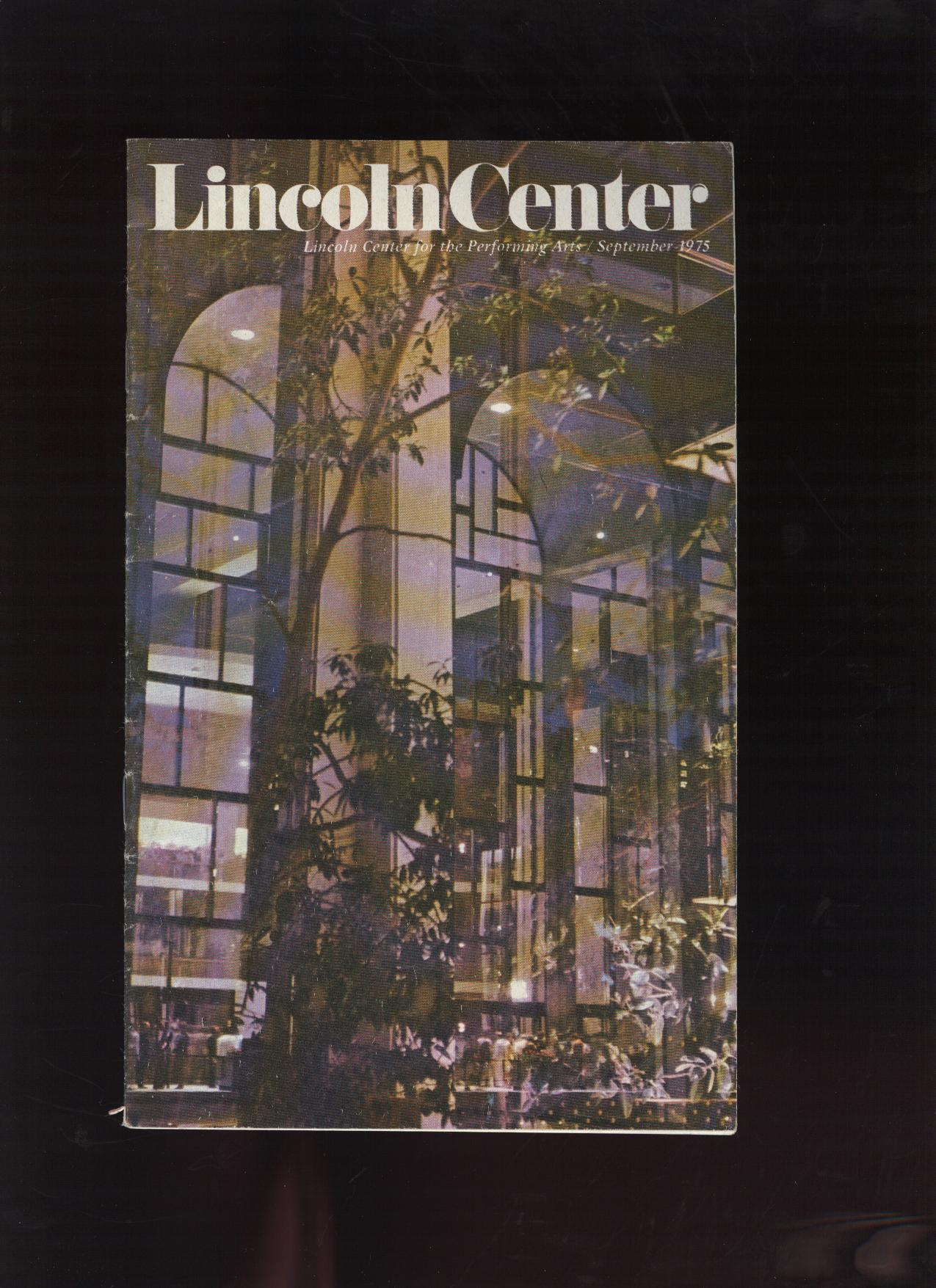

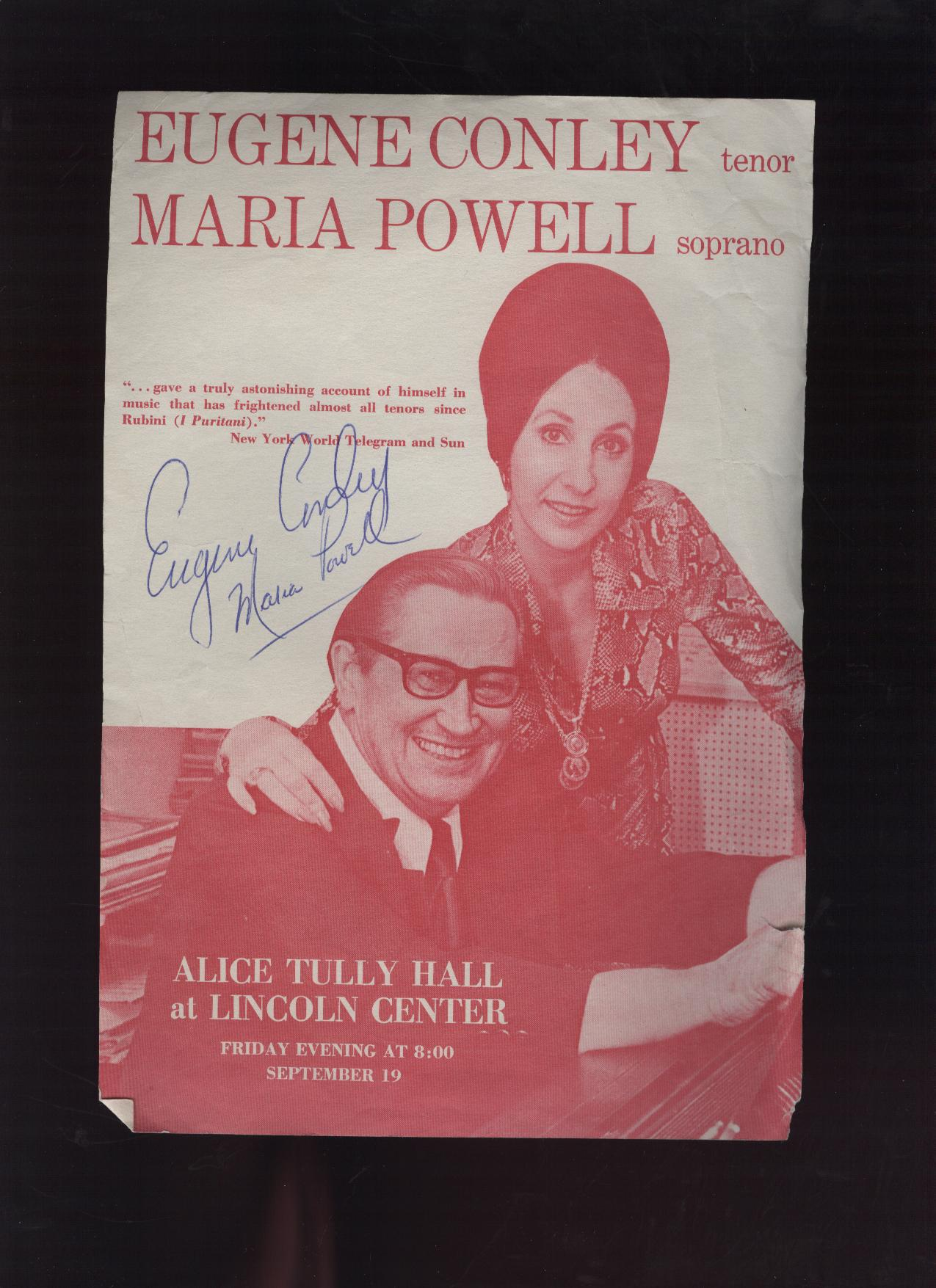

Eugene Conley (March 12, 1908 – December 18, 1981) was a celebrated American operatic tenor.

Born in Lynn, Massachusetts, Conley studied under Ettore Verna, and made his official debut as the Duke of Mantua in Rigoletto, at the Brooklyn Academy of Music in 1940. In 1945, he first appeared with the New York City Opera, as Rodolfo in La bohème, and went on to appear with that company until 1950. He also sang with the Opéra-Comique in Paris, the Teatro alla Scala in Milan (I puritani, 1950; then Les vêpres siciliennes opposite Maria Callas, 1951), and Covent Garden in London.

The tenor made his Metropolitan Opera debut in 1950, in the title role of Faust, and appeared with the Met many times until 1956.

On television, he appeared on "The Voice of Firestone" (1950–53) and "Cavalcade of Stars" (1951-52).

Conley was artist-in-residence at the University of North Texas College of Music from 1960 until his retirement in 1978. From 1960 to 1967, he directed its Opera Workshop. In his retirement year, he presented a joint recital at Alice Tully Hall, Lincoln Center, with soprano Maria Powell. Among his students was Henry Price (tenor). He died in Denton, Texas, at the age of seventy-three.

Conley's discography includes complete recordings of Faust (with Eleanor Steber and Cesare Siepi, for Columbia, 1951), the first recording of The Rake's Progress (conducted by the composer, Igor Stravinsky, for Columbia, 1953), and Beethoven's Missa Solemnis (conducted by Arturo Toscanini, for RCA, 1953). In 1999, VAI published, on Compact Discs, a 1952 performance of Rigoletto from the New Orleans Opera Association, with Leonard Warren, Hilde Gueden, Conley, and the young Norman Treigle as Count Monterone, conducted by Walter Herbert. A "pirated" recording of the Verdi Requiem exists, with Herva Nelli and Conley, conducted by Guido Cantelli (1954).

Conley's recording of the aria, "Here I Stand - Since It Is Not by Merit," from Stravinsky's The Rake's Progress, was featured on the film soundtrack for the 2018 Ruth Bader Ginsburg biographic film, "On the Basis of Sex."

Conley also performed at the Presidential Inaugurations of President Nixon and President Eisenhower.

Personal Life: Eugene Thomas Conley born March 12, 1908, Lynn, Essex County, Massachusetts, to parents Reuben A. Conley and Josephine Farnsworth. Gene married three times. His first wife, Sara "Sally" Abbott, born 1907 Massachusetts, died 1993 Florida. They married in 1930 and later divorced. They had Eugene's only child, Eugene Thomas Conley, Jr., born August 25, 1935, Massachusetts, died April 18, 2010, Florida. Gene Jr. had no children. Eugene Sr. married next, in 1948, star of the opera, Winifred Heidt, born Huntoon - Dallas Morning News, March 19, 1948. They also divorced. His third marriage was to Alvah Odetta Young, born 1914, Wisconsin, died 1989, Denton, Texas. Alvah had children by a prior marriage to Victor Lea, a founder of the Community Research Bureau in New York who died in 1959. Hyer and Allied Families: Historical & Personal Accounts - Notable & Notorious Paperback – April 25, 2022
