= Don Lucas =

American musician

Donald Lucas is a trombone artist and educator. He is an associate professor and Brass, Woodwind & Percussion department chair at the Boston University School of Music and served as president of the International Trombone Association.

== Honors and achievements ==
Lucas, a Fulbright Scholar, is the recipient of the Premier Prix at the Guildhall School of Music and Drama; he is the only brass musician ever to receive this prize. Lucas also has received the Bronze Medal L'unamite, Toulon International Solo Competition; First Place "Fellow", Harmony Ridge Brass Festival; first place solo and group competitions, National Christian Artists Seminar; first prize winner, ITA Frank Smith Trombone Solo Competition; and first prize, the American Classic Trombone Quartet, Summit Brass International Brass Chamber Group Competition. Lucas has performed under notable conductors Leonard Slatkin, Iván Fischer, John Adams, Hugh Wolf, and Christopher Hogwood.

Lucas has also commissioned and premiered many works by composers Theodore Antoniou, Gary D. Belshaw, Derek Bourgeouis, Jacques Casterede, Franz Cibulka, Adam Gorb, Alun Hoddinott, Elena Roussanova Lucas, David Maslanka, Daniel Schnyder, Bruce Stark, and Fisher Tull.

== Performance and teaching ==
=== International ===
Lucas has led masterclasses and performed recitals internationally, including:

United Kingdom

- The British Trombone Society Festival
- Guildhall School of Music and Drama
- Chetham’s School of Music
- Repton Brass Festival
- Royal Academy of Music
- Royal Northern College of Music
- The Royal Scottish Academy of Music
- Wigmore Hall
- Nottingham Trent University

Russia

- Moscow Conservatory
- Saint Petersburg Conservatory
- Fine Arts Institute – Vladivostok

Other international engagements

- Korean Trombone Festival
- Brazilian Trombone and Tuba Association Festival
- Paris Conservatory
- Trombones de Costa Rica International Brass Festival
- International Trombone Festival – 1996 (Feldkirch, Austria)
- International Trombone Symposium (Melbourne, Australia)

=== United States ===
In addition to serving on the faculties of Boston University, Texas Tech University, Eastern New Mexico University, and Sam Houston State University, Lucas has taught numerous master classes and has given many performance across the country at venues such as Weill Recital Hall at Carnegie Hall, the Juilliard School, Terrace Theatre at the Kennedy Center, the Eastman School of Music, the United States Army Band "Pershing's Own", the West Point United States Military Academy Band, the United States Naval Academy Band, the Midwest Band and Orchestra Clinic, the MasterWorks Festival, the New York Conference of Brass Scholarships, the Eastern Trombone Workshop, 76 Trombones + 4 Trombones Festival, Harmony Ridge Brass Festival, College Band Directors National Association Convention, the Texas Bandmasters Association Convention, the Texas Music Educators Association Convention, the Christian Artists Music Festival, the Las Vegas Music Festival, the Boston University Tanglewood Institute, and dozens of appearances at universities, festivals, camps, and schools.

== Education ==
Lucas attended the University of North Texas College of Music, Texas Tech University (BM, MM), the University of Houston (DMA work), and the Guildhall School of Music and Drama (Advanced Solo Studies Diploma). His principal teachers include Denis Wick, Robert Deahl, Al Lube, Carsten Svanberg, Phil Wilson, Michel Becquet, Allen Barnhill, John Marcellus, Leon Brown, and Dave Maser.

== Discography ==
Lucas has released two solo albums: Hymns for Trombone and Cantabile both showcase his lyrical style. He can also be heard on recordings with the Saint Paul Chamber Orchestra and the American Wind Symphony Orchestra. He has recorded solo and chamber music for North South Recordings and Warwick Music Publishers.
