= Robert Blocker =

American musician

Henry and Lucy Moses Dean of Music, Yale University
- In office 2006–2023
- Succeeded by: José García-León

Provost and Vice President for Academic Affairs at Southern Methodist University
- In office 2005–2006
- Preceded by: Ross C. Murfin
- Succeeded by: Paul W. Ludden

Dean of Music, Yale University
- In office 1995–2005

Founding Dean, School of the Arts and Architecture
- In office 1991–1995

Dean, College of Music
- In office 1988–1991

Dean, School of Music, Baylor University
- In office 1983–1988

Dean, School of Music, University of North Carolina at Greensboro
- In office 1981–1983

Personal details
- Born: September 4, 1946 (age 79)
- Education: Furman University (BA); North Texas (MM, DMA)
- Occupation: Music school dean Music educator

Robert Blocker (born September 4, 1946) is an American classical pianist, music educator, and university administrator, who served as Dean of the Yale School of Music since July 1995 until 2023. He is a Steinway artist.

== Education ==
Blocker earned a Bachelor of Arts degree from Furman University in 1968. He earned graduate degrees — Master of Music in 1970 and Doctor of Musical Arts in 1972 — from the University of North Texas College of Music, where he studied with eminent American pianist Richard Brannan Cass (1931–2009), an alumnus of Furman and Juilliard and 1953 Fulbright Scholar to the National School of Music of Paris where he had studied with Nadia Boulanger. In 1986, while serving as dean at Baylor, Blocker was a fellow at the Institute for Educational Management at Harvard in 1986.

== Honorary degrees ==
- 2014 — Doctor of Music, University of South Carolina
- 2006 — Professor of Piano, Central Conservatory of Music, Beijing
- 2003 — Doctor of Music, Converse College
- 1995 — Master of Arts, Yale University
- 1992 — Doctor of Humanities, Furman University

== Honors & awards ==
- Elm-Ivy Award, Yale University, April 2008
- Founder's Award, PORTALS, The Hotchkiss School
- President’s Citation for Extraordinary Service, University of North Texas, 2005
- Honorary Professor of Piano, Central Conservatory of Music, Beijing, 2004
- Elected Member, The Grolier Club, New York City, a society for bibliophiles, 2003
- Yale Tercentennial Medal recipient, 2001
- Featured in Steinway and Sons film commemorating 300th anniversary of the piano, 2000
- Distinguished Alumni Award, Furman University, 1999
- Order of the Palmetto, 1999 (highest distinction of service awarded by the state of South Carolina)
- Outstanding Professor, Baylor University, 1986
- Artist-in-Residence, South Carolina Governor's School for the Arts & Humanities, 1985
- Teaching Excellence Award Grant, Stephen F. Austin State University, 1980
- Artist Teacher, National Piano Foundation, 1980–1981
- Artist Roster, Texas Commission on the Arts, 1978–1981
- Artist Faculty, Brevard Music Center, 1974–1976
- Outstanding Teacher Award, Brevard College, 1975
- Texas State Doctoral Fellowship, 1970–1972
- Outstanding Doctoral Candidate, University of North Texas College of Music, 1972
- Outstanding Masters Candidate, University of North Texas College of Music, 1970
- Rotary Scholar, 1964–1968
- Presser Scholar, 1964–1968

== Selected publications ==
1. The Robert Shaw Reader, Robert Blocker, Yale University Press (©2004) OCLC 56653473
2. The Arts: Reflections of Society, Design for Arts in Education, July/August 1988 OCLC 5004435
3. Philanthropy and the Arts: Weaving the Cultural Fabric of Society, Design for Arts in Education, March/April 1987 OCLC 5004435
4. A Performer Analyzes, Noteworthy, Winter, 1981 OCLC 9250033
5. The Arts: A Basic Educational Component, The American Music Teacher, September/October 1981; proceedings of the Symposium in Rhetorico of the Arts, Federation of North Texas Area Universities (1980) OCLC 1480467
6. Teacher Certification Requirements in Texas: The Unending Struggle for Quality, proceedings of the annual meeting of the National Association of Schools of Music, Chicago (1980)
7. Chopin's Revolution, Piano Guild Notes, September/October 1978 OCLC 1004537

== Selected discography ==
- Mozart, Piano Concertos Nos. 12, 13, and 14, Naxos Records (2010) OCLC 690227850, 767878821

Recorded May 14–16, 2007, Morse Recital Hall, Sprague Hall, The School of Music, Yale University
Blocker, piano; Biava Quartet

- Beethoven, Piano Concerto No. 3, Credia Classics (S. Korea) (2002)

Recorded live, July 12, 2002, Beethoven Festival, Woosong Arts Center, Daejon, South Korea
Blocker, piano
Daejon Philharmonic, Shinik Hahm, conductor

== Family & growing up ==
Blocker is a graduate of the St. Andrews Parish High School, which as since merged with West Ashley High School in the Charleston County School District of South Carolina. He was president of the Charleston County Student Council and is a member of the St. Andrews Parish High School Hall of Fame.
