= Arkansas Symphony Orchestra =

American symphony orchestra

Arkansas Symphony Orchestra (ASO) is a professional American orchestra based in Little Rock, Arkansas.

== Concert venues ==
- Witherspoon Auditorium at Arkansas Tech University
- Albert Pike Masonic Center in downtown Little Rock
- Robinson Center
- Garvan Woodland Gardens

Note: This list is not fully complete.

== History ==
- The Arkansas Symphony Orchestra was founded in 1966.
- David Itkin was the conductor of the orchestra from 1993 to 2010.
- Geoffrey Robson was appointed as music director in 2023.
- In February 2012, actor George Takei performed with the group in a Holocaust memorial.

== See also ==
- Music of Arkansas
