= David Itkin =

American conductor and composer (born 1957)

David Chester Itkin (born May 2, 1957) is an American conductor and composer. He served as music director and conductor of the Arkansas Symphony Orchestra from 1993 to 2010, and currently holds the title of conductor laureate of that orchestra. He is music director and conductor of the Abilene Philharmonic Orchestra and professor of music and director of orchestral studies at the University of North Texas College of Music. University of North Texas Symphony Orchestra.

== Composer ==
As a composer, Itkin's most notable works are Jonah, a tone poem for narrator and orchestra, and an oratorio called Exodus: An Oratorio in Three Parts. Exodus premiered in April 2005 in Little Rock, with William Shatner narrating. It was released on CD in 2008.

The Arkansas Symphony Orchestra recorded Itkin's first film score in 2006 for the film Sugar Creek, released in 2007.

== Conductor ==
From 1988 to 1993, Itkin served as associate conductor of the Alabama Symphony Orchestra, during which time he was made Honorary Lieutenant Governor of the State of Alabama for outstanding service to the arts. He was conductor of the Birmingham Opera Theatre and the Kingsport [Tennessee] Symphony from 1992 to 1995, music director for the Lucius Woods Festival Concerts in Solon Springs, Wisconsin from 1993 to 2000, and music director of Chicago's Lake Forest Symphony Orchestra from 1997 to 2000.

In 1993, Itkin began his 17-year tenure as conductor (and later conductor/music director) of the Arkansas Symphony Orchestra. He was appointed music director/conductor of the Abilene Philharmonic Orchestra in 2005, and music director/conductor of the Las Vegas Philharmonic Orchestra in 2007. In autumn 2008, Itkin became professor of music and director of orchestral studies at the University of North Texas College of Music.

In May 2009, Maestro Itkin was awarded an honorary doctorate of humane letters by Lyon College.

In 2012, Itkin was involved in a contentious departure from the Las Vegas Philharmonic Orchestra. When he announced that he would not be renewing his contract, which ended in 2013, members of the board of directors flew to Dallas to complete a buyout of his remaining contract, effectively keeping him from returning for his final year. Itkin called the actions "unprecedented and personally insulting".

Itkin has been a guest conductor with more than 40 symphony orchestras, opera and ballet companies worldwide, including the San Diego Symphony, the Winnipeg Symphony, the Fort Worth Symphony, the Slovenska Filharmonija, the Seoul Philharmonic, the Shanghai Broadcast Symphony, the Illinois Symphony, the Delaware Symphony, the New Hampshire Symphony, the Indianapolis Chamber Orchestra, the Baltimore Chamber Orchestra, the Annapolis Symphony, the National Repertory Orchestra, the Colorado Symphony, and the Reno Chamber Orchestra.

Itkin is the author of Conducting Concerti: A Technical and Interpretive Guide, published in August 2014.
