= Mary McCormic =

American operatic soprano (1889–1981)

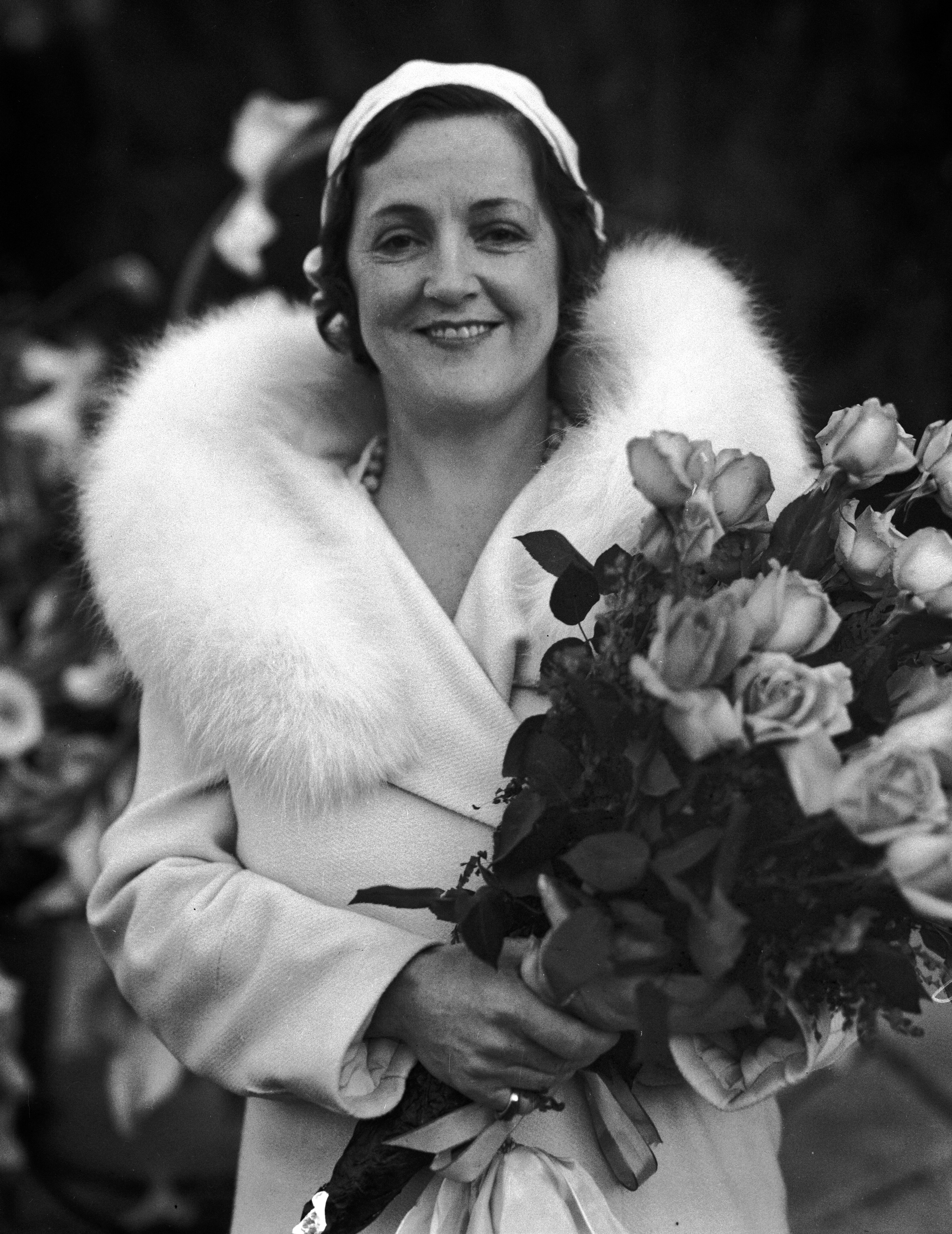
- McCormic in 1935
- Born: Mamie Harris; November 11, 1889; Belleville, Arkansas, U.S.
- Died: February 10, 1981 (aged 91); Amarillo, Texas, U.S.
- Education: Ouachita College; University of Arkansas; Northwestern University
- Occupation: Opera singer (lyric soprano)
- Height: 5 ft 2 in (157 cm)
- Spouses: Kenneth Joseph Rankin (m. 1908; div. 1916); Chester Adrian Macormic (Undated, div.); Prince Serge M'Divani (m. 1931; div. 1933); Homer V. Johannsen (m. 1936; div. 1937)
- Children: 1

Mary McCormic (November 11, 1889 – February 10, 1981) was an American operatic soprano and a professor of opera at the University of North Texas College of Music (1945–1960).

== Career ==
For more than a decade (early 1920s to late 1930s), McCormic was among the famous sopranos in the world. She was most known for her leading roles with the Paris National Opera, the Opéra-Comique (14 years), the Monte Carlo Opera, the Chicago Civic Opera (10 years) and also headlined at the Metropolitan Opera. She spent much of 1937 touring with the Kryl Symphony Orchestra.

McCormic was born in Belleville, Arkansas. A onetime obscure Arkansas housewife, McCormic rose to stardom and enjoyed a colorful personal life — four marriages and four divorces, almost a fifth marriage, a high-dollar lawsuit , a boom and bust personal wealth, witty humor, and a brush with royalty. McCormic captured the world's intrigue with the panache of the operas she starred, all with the backdrop of being born at the end of the Gilded Age. She grew up as a teenager during World War I, flourished as an opera superstar through the Roaring Twenties, the Prohibition, the Jazz Age, and the Great Crash; and then ended two high-profile marriages in the throes of the Great Depression. She died, age 91, in Amarillo, Texas.

=== Selected singing roles ===
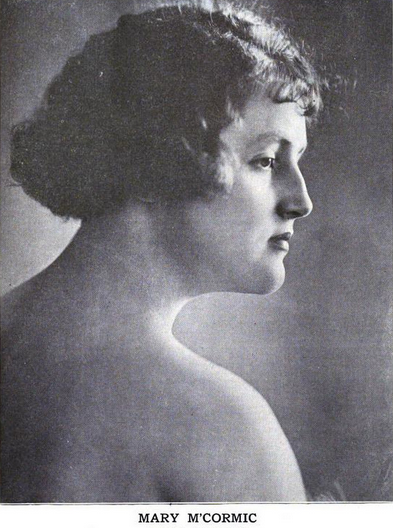
Mary McCormic from a 1921 publication.

- 1921–1922 Season — Operatic debut as Micaela in Carmen. McCormic was a protégé of Mary Garden, who, rather than sing, debuted as general director for what became the final year of Chicago Opera Association.
- February 1 and 8, 1922 — New York debut as Musetta in La Boheme at the Manhattan Opera House.
- 1923 — Referred to as "the Cowgirl Soprano" by The New York Times, McCormic and Charles Marshall sang the leading roles in the premiere of The Snow Bird, an American one-act opera.
- July 24, 1926 — McCormic was signally honored by receiving the title role for a special presentation of Romeo and Juliet with the Paris National Opera at the Paris Opera House in honor of Mulai Yusef, sultan of Morocco.
- July 23, 1929 — Opera Comique debut, singing the title role in Manon. She and William Martin, in July 1927, earned the distinction of being the only Americans singing in leading roles with Opéra-Comique. McCormic was the first American woman in 60 years to sign a long-term contract with Opera Comique.

== Artistic management ==
In 1924, McCormic, early in her career, gained the artist management services of Charles L. Wagner (1869–1956), who also managed world figures that included Mary Garden, Amelita Galli-Curci, Walter Gieseking, Jussi Björling, Alexander Kipnis, and Jeanette MacDonald. In 1938, McCormic was managed by Mme. LaReine.

== Early life ==
Born in Belleville, Arkansas, and raised in Dardanelle, Arkansas and Ola, Arkansas, McCormic, was known growing up as Mamie Harris. Mary McCormic was one of four children born to:

- John H. Harris (c. 1860 in Forsyth, Georgia – 9 November 1946) and wife,
- Mary Jimmie Harris (née Williard; c. 1865 in Tennessee – 31 December 1929 in Amarillo, Texas)

1. Odelle Crawford Harris (4 July 1886 in Belleville, Arkansas – 26 May 1950 in Amarillo, Texas)
2. Thurman Harris (died young)
3. Mamie Harris (11 November 1889 in Belleville, Arkansas – 10 February 1981 in Amarillo, Texas)
4. Williard Harris (10 February 1892 in Yell County, Arkansas – 24 March 1949 in Amarillo, Texas)
5. Norborn Harris (c. 1898 – 10 February 1944 in San Francisco)

1. Johnnie Harris (a girl, died young)

Mamie's interest in becoming an opera star began at age nine, and continued while attending Ola High School of Ola, Arkansas. She, with her family, moved to Portales, New Mexico in 1907, then to Amarillo, Texas in 1909.

Emil Frey Myers (1886–1957) gave McCormic's her first voice lessons in Amarillo. He was the conductor the Amarillo Civic Chorus and was a major concert promoter in the Texas Panhandle. Myers, with his wife, Lila, founded the Amarillo School of Music, Inc.

McCormic's father and two brothers, Odell and Williard, built a grocery store business — J H Harris & Sons and Harris Food Stores and Rolling Stone Stores (as many as 10 stores in Texas located in Borger, Pampa, Dalhart and Amarillo). The business was sold in 1946, shortly before the death of the father. The father, Odell, and Williard also operated a 58,000-acre (230 km^{2}) ranch in Union County, New Mexico. The father purchased the first portion of the ranch in 1915.

During a 1914 Tri-State Fair Music Festival in Amarillo, McCormic became aware of the operatic possibilities of her voice. By way of a Methodist Choir in Chicago and a singing contest sponsored by Mary Garden, her operatic potential became known to others.

=== College ===
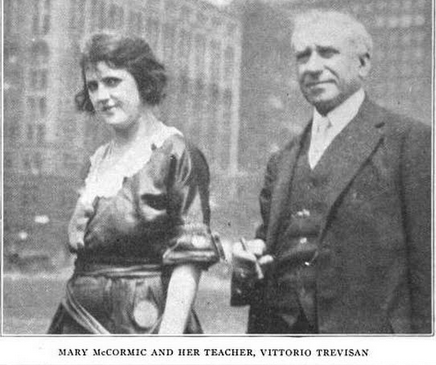
Mary McCormic and Vittorio Trevisan, from a 1921 publication.

McCormic studied music at Ouachita College, University of Arkansas and then, with the intention of becoming a lyric soprano, Northwestern University where she took vocal lessons. McCormic became a protégé of Mary Garden (1874–1967). Both McCormic and Garden had been vocal students of the renowned voice teacher Mrs. Sarah Robinson-Duff (née Robinson; 1858–1934)

== Marriages ==
Kenneth Joseph; Rankin	Born January 27, 1886, Perryville, Arkansas; died June 8, 1946, Sacramento; Joseph and Mary married around 1908 in Arkansas. During their marriage, they had a daughter: 1. Reba McCormic, aka Alexandra Rebecca (Sandie) Goshie (née Rankin; 16 February 1910 Ola, Arkansas – 23 January 2002 McLean, Virginia). Sandie was married to John Louis Goshie (1908–1974) a US Foreign Service Officer. Kenneth and Mary divorced in 1916 in Chicago.
Chester; Adrian; Macormic	Born c. 1883, Saugus, Massachusetts; marriage ended in divorce — Chester, a reputed Chicago mob lawyer, was Mary's "second husband." However, Mary described the marriage as a "sham" in Liberty magazine. The marriage occurred in secret in Kalamazoo. Chester later revealed that the marriage was not valid because it took place while both were married to others. Chester had married Ava in 1908. Mary began using the name McCormic after a Chicago Civic Opera employee misspelled Macomic. The 1920 US Census records show them as being married. Chester died at the age of 64 on April 16, 1956 in Oak Park, Illinois.
Serge; M'Divani	Married April 27, 1931, Phoenix, Arizona; divorced November 14, 1933, Los Angeles County
Homer V. Johannsen	Married November 25, 1936, Kansas City, Missouri; divorced July 14, 1937

== Filmography ==
- 1933: Paddy the Next Best Thing

== Teaching ==
In 1944, Wilfred Bain, dean of the University of North Texas College of Music, recruited Mary McCormic to create and direct an Opera Workshop. McCormic transformed herself from diva to artist-in-residence educator. She founded, defined, directed, and, when necessary, defended the school's first Opera Workshop. She built the Opera Workshop from scratch – on a shoestring budget – molding it over 16 years into what has become her crowning legacy that, for 82 years, has enriched the Southwestern United States. In books and memoirs of accomplishments, Bain often tells of the hiring of Mary McCormic as one of his accomplishments at North Texas.

The North Texas Opera Workshop was the first collegiate touring opera workshops west of the Mississippi and, at the time of its founding, was the only opera production company in existence in the Southwest. The San Antonio Grand Opera, Houston Grand Opera, Dallas Opera, Opera in the Heights and others were not yet in existence.

Through the opera workshop, McCormic pioneered an approach to opera in an era that wiped out major opera companies on the heels of the Great Depression. The new "low-cost workshop" model also offered new opportunities for composers who otherwise would never have their operas produced. And the workshop model gave hope for opera itself, when many in the world dismissed opera as a bygone luxury of the rich. The new "low cost model" also gave access in regions of the world that otherwise had little hope of having opera.

Under McCormic, the opera workshop performed locally, toured, and did broadcasts in radio and TV.

When the Dallas Opera was founded in 1957, the UNT Opera Workshop and Vocal Studies provided a steady supply of singers for the Dallas Opera Chorus.

In 1966, McCormic retired and moved to Amarillo to make her home with her widowed sister-in-law, Mrs. Odell Harris.

The UNT Opera Workshop is an integral part of one of the more comprehensive music schools in the world; a school that, since the 1940s, and in recent years, holds the largest enrollment of any music institution accredited by the National Association of Schools of Music.

=== UNT Opera Workshop Productions ===
==== Directed by Mary McCormic ====
- The Bohemian Girl (1944)
- The Chocolate Soldier (Spring 1945)
- The Bohemian Girl (Summer 1945)
- The Stranger of Manzano (premier, May 1946)
- The Bohemian Girl (1946)
- Rigoletto (March 1948)
- Abduction from the Seraglio (May 1949)
- Daughter of the Regiment (Jan 1950) †
- Romeo and Juliet (1950)
- Otello (Nov 1951)
- La Boheme (Dec 1952)
- Faust (Dec 1953)
- HMS Pinafore (July 1954)
- Abduction from the Seraglio (May 1954)
- Die Fledermaus (April 1955)
- La Boheme (1955)
- Down in the Valley (1955)
- Trial by Jury (1955)
- The Saint of Bleecker Street (Summer 1955, 2nd Act)
- Boris Godunov (Summer 1955, last Act)
- Don Pasquale (Summer 1955, duets)
- Madama Butterfly (Summer 1955, duets)
- Pagliacci (1956)
- The Princess and the Pea (May 1956)
- La Serva Padrona (May 1956)
- La Boheme (Summer 1956)
- Down in the Valley (Summer 1956)
- Rigoletto (1957)
- Trouble in Tahiti (1957)
- Amelia Goes to the Ball (1957)
- The Impresario (1957)
- The Emperor's New Clothes (1957)
- The Marriage of Figaro (two casts, 1958)
- Faust (a scene, 1958)
- Comedy on the Bridge (1958)
- The Barber of Seville (excerpts, 1958)
- La Traviata (last act, 1958)
- Comedy on the Bridge (1959)
- Cavalleria Rusticana (1959)
- Tosca (1960)
- Dec 1958 — McCormic directed the first televised opera in the Southwestern United States on WBAP-TV Fort Worth in a student production of Carmen

† Mary Garden supervised the final ten-days of rehearsals
