= Carolyn Steinberg =

American flutist and composer (born 1956)

Carolyn Steinberg (born 1956) is an American flutist and composer.

== Biography ==
Steinberg graduated from North Texas State University with a Bachelor of Music degree in music theory in 1978. She went on to study composition with Ludmila Ulehla at the Manhattan School of Music where she received a master's degree, and with and Bernard Rands at Juilliard where she received a Doctor of Musical Arts in 1989. She also studied in Europe with Franco Donatoni in Siena, Italy, and Brian Ferneyhough and Francis Travis in Germany.

During her studies, Steinberg began working as a music teacher. She taught at Freiburg Conservatory of Music from 1984–86, at Mannes School of Music from 1992–96, and at The Juilliard School, Pre-College Division, from 1993-2001. Steinberg received the Goddard Lieberson Award of the American Academy and Institute of Arts and Letters in 1990.

== Works ==
Selected compositions include:

- La Ventana
- El nectar de Apam
- Fire in Los Alamos
- Ninananna
- Danzon Macabre
- In the Early Dawn
- Alchemy
- The Moon Dances Tonight
- The Jester and the Necklace
- What We Use
- Are You Shaky?
- Allemande
- Courante
- Sarabande
- Siciliano e Cubano
- Do Not Stand at My Grave and Weep

Her works have been recorded and issued on CD, including:

- Songs, Dances, Duos chamber music (2007)
