= University of North Texas Symphony Orchestra =

The University of North Texas Symphony Orchestra was established in 1920s at the University of North Texas College of Music—then known as North Texas State Teachers College School of Music. In 2008, the student musicians in the orchestra represented 25 states and 12 countries.

David Itkin became Music Director of the UNT Symphony Orchestra and Director of Orchestral Studies, effective fall 2008.

== Conductors ==
1924–1925
Raymond Stubblefield Riggs: In 1926, Riggs moved on to become head of the Department of Wind Instruments at the College of Music and Arts, Dallas, Texas (founded 1926).
1925–1927
Amos Elbert Barksdale: a graduate of Baylor University (BA 1921) and in 1930, studied at the University of Chicago.
1927–1944
Floyd Freeman Graham: Although the symphony orchestra had existed since 1924, it gave its first public performance under the direction of Floyd Graham in 1927. Beginning that same year, student musicians received college credit for participation. In the fall of 1939, when the School of Music was experiencing a surge in enrollment, the caliber of student musicians in the symphony rose and deepened. The orchestra performed several times a year and was regarded as outstanding.
1936–1944
Robert Lincoln Marquis, Jr.: conducted the symphony orchestra during the summers. He was the son of the former UNT President Robert Lincoln Marquis.
1944–1947
Joseph Kirshbaum: a violinist, composer, conductor, and an alumnus of Yale (bachelors and masters), where he also had taught. He is the father of Ralph Kirshbaum, cellist. He had joined the North Texas faculty in 1944. Before joining the faculty, Kirshbaum had directed the Messiah Festival Orchestra of Lindsborg, KS. And before that, he had organized and directed the Oberlin Conservatory String Orchestra. He also had taught strings at Cornell. His wife, Gertrude Morris Kirshbaum (1912–1973) taught harp at Texas Woman's University. Kirshbaum, for 25 years, was a celebrated conductor of the East Texas Symphony Orchestra. He retired from the ETSO in 1978.
1947–1948
Walter Hutchinson Hodgson: was the Dean (see University of North Texas College of Music)
1948–1972
George Ellers Morey: conducted the University of North Texas Symphony Orchestra for 25 years. He earned an Artist Diploma from the Curtis Institute and graduate degrees from the University of Illinois and the University of Iowa. An influential teacher and mentor to generations of musicians throughout his distinguished career at North Texas, he served as Professor of Flute and taught viola and composition. He retired in 1980 as Professor Emeritus. Morey was one of five faculty members hired by the Acting Dean Walter Hodgson in 1947, along with Gene Hall (professor of "Dance Band"), Frank McKinley, and Dorothy Young. Morey also researched ways to reach children with autism through music
1973–1982
Anshel Brusilow: inherited a high caliber symphony, and transformed it into an internationally acclaimed student orchestra. University concerts under his direction never performed to less than capacity audiences; and the capacity overflow – people sitting on the floor and in the isles, even on the stage and in the wings – amplified the urgency to build a long overdue larger, superior concert hall. The Murchison Performing Arts Center, which houses Winspear Auditorium (a 928-seat & 97 choral seat concert hall) and a 400-seat Lyric Opera Theater. Brusilow also greatly intensified and expanded orchestral conducting studies.

Brusilow made his Philadelphia Orchestra debut on violin in 1944. He served as Concertmaster of the New Orleans Symphony Orchestra (1954–1955); served as associate concertmaster of the Cleveland Orchestra (1955–1959); served as concertmaster of the Philadelphia Orchestra (under Eugene Ormandy) (1959–1966); founded and conducted the Philadelphia Chamber Orchestra (1961–1965); conducted the Philadelphia Chamber Symphony (1966–1971); served as an executive director and conducted the Dallas Symphony (1971–1973). Brusilow entered the Curtis Institute at age 11, and attended Philadelphia Musical Academy at sixteen, becoming the youngest conducting student ever accepted by Pierre Monteux.

1982–1984
Geoffrey Simon: a prolific conductor, originally from Australia, with several acclaimed recordings with major orchestras. Simon conducted the UNT Symphony, as well as the Opera orchestra, and taught conducting. Simon was a former student of Herbert von Karajan, Rudolf Kempe, Hans Swarowsky, and Igor Markevich.
1984–1989
Serge R. Zehnacker: born in Alsace, France, conducted the university orchestras as well as the opera orchestra and taught conducting. Zehnacker led a distinguished career as a conductor and after North Texas, from 1989 to 2006, conducted and taught for 17 years at the North Carolina School of the Arts.
1989–2008
Anshel Brusilow: returned to conduct the UNT Symphony and teach conducting, filling the longest artistic appointment of his life. Before returning, he had served as professor and director of the symphony orchestra at Southern Methodist University. His tenure at North Texas was highly acclaimed and spanned 28 years.
2008–present
David Chester Itkin: became the conductor of the UNT Symphony in the fall of 2008. He holds a bachelors (1980) and master's degree (1982) from the Eastman School of Music.

== Major tours ==
- 1992 – The UNT Symphony Orchestra performed in Spain and throughout Mediterranean.
- 1993 – By invitation, the symphony orchestra performed Verdi’s Requiem in Monterrey, Mexico.
