= Douglas Walter =

Dr. Douglas William Walter DMA
- Occupation: Professor of Percussion - University of Colorado at Boulder
- Awards: First Prize - Concert Artists Guild Competition

Academic background
- Education: DMA Percussion, MM Percussion, MM Orchestral Conducting, BM Music Education and Music Theory, BA French
- Alma mater: Temple University, University of Michigan, North Texas State University, University of Colorado
- Thesis: The Performance of Contrapuntal Music on the Marimba and Vibraphone (1984)
- Academic advisors: Alan Abel, David Samuels

Academic work
- Discipline: Percussion
- Sub-discipline: Marimba, Vibraphone, Timpani

Douglas William Walter, DMA, is the first marimba and vibraphone artist to win a First Prize in the Concert Artists Guild Competition in NYC. He served as Professor of Percussion and Jazz at University of Colorado Boulder College of Music from 1990-2025.

He has performed over 350 solo recitals and concerts in forty states, Canada, Brazil and nine countries in Europe, in addition to international conventions of the Percussive Arts Society, International Association for Jazz Education and The National Association for Music Education.

== Orchestral experience ==
Walter has performed with the Dallas Symphony Orchestra, Fort Worth Symphony Orchestra, Oregon Symphony Orchestra, Santa Fe Opera Orchestra, Colorado Ballet Orchestra, and Philadelphia Orchestra. He is Principal with the Boulder Philharmonic Orchestra, and Sunriver Music Festival Orchestras. He has performed as a member of the percussion section of the Colorado Ballet Orchestra for 26 years. He played with the Colorado Music Festival for 16 years, 10 as Principal Percussionist. He toured for 30 years with the Westminster Brass until they disbanded in March 2019.

== Jazz experience ==
As a jazz musician he has recorded (on drum set and vibes) with Michael Pagàn, the University of North Texas College of Music One O'Clock Lab Band, the Modest Jazz Trio, the Lawless Percussion and Jazz Ensemble, The CU Jazz Asylum Faculty Quintet, the DAD Trio, Rim of the Well (with Steve Mullins), and the Doug Walter Vibraphone Trio.

== Education ==
Walter holds three undergraduate degrees: a Dual Bachelor of Music (BM) in Music Education and Music Theory from North Texas State University, summa cum laude, and a Bachelor of Arts (BA) in French from the University of Colorado, summa cum laude. He further holds two master's degrees, a Master of Music (MM) in Orchestral Conducting and a Master of Music in Percussion Performance, both from the University of Michigan. Walter also holds a doctoral level degree, a Doctor of Musical Arts (DMA) in Percussion Performance from Temple University (1984).

== Compositions and endorsements ==
Walter's compositions are published by Dutch Music Partners, Matrix Publishing, and Alfred.

His compositions or arrangements include:

- The Trout – Franz Schubert (arr. Walter) Mallet Instrument Duet
- Amazing Grace: Marimba Solo
- Ypres, published by Dutch Music Partners.

He endorses Encore Mallets where he has a signature line of marimba and vibraphone mallets. He also endorses Sabian Cymbals and Yamaha Mallet Instruments.

== Students ==
Walter's notable students include Dr. Chris Hanning, Past President of the Percussive Arts Society, DCI percussion arranger/instructor and award winning band director Ray Ulibarri, orchestral percussionist and member of Caixa Trio Amy Smith, Director of Percusson Studies at Idaho State University Thom Hasenpflug, orchestral percussionist Stephen Bott, instructional author and drummer Ryan Alexander Bloom, Chair of the Music Department at the University of Wisconsin-Superior Brett Jones, University of Colorado lecturer Carl Dixon, Royal Hawaiian Band percussionist Allan Ward, orchestral percussionist Jennie Doris, Hope College lecturer Mark Lopez, award winning percussion instructor and Rocky Mountain Percussion Association Hall of Famer Kathy Marvin, and Auburn University professor of percussion and associate director of bands Doug Rosener.
