= Douglas Water, Loch Fyne =

Douglas Water
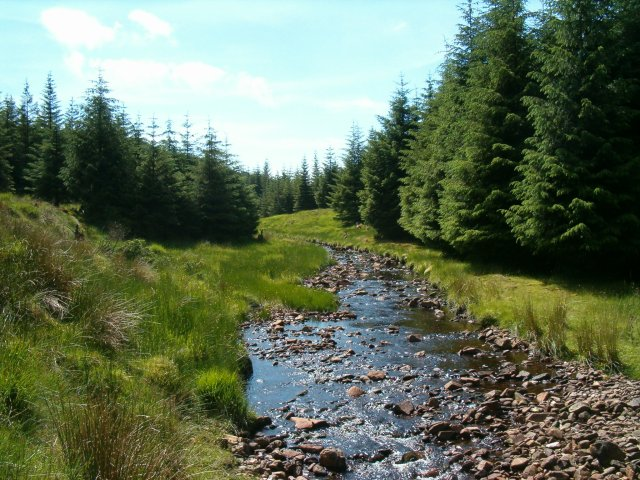
- Douglas Water
- Native name: Dùghlas) (Scottish Gaelic)

Physical characteristics
- Source
  - coordinates: 56°13′12″N 05°10′46″W
- Mouth
  - coordinates: 56°11′48″N 05°06′31″W

The Douglas Water (Scottish Gaelic: Dùghlas) is a river in Argyll and Bute, in west of Scotland. It emerges from the northeastern end of the diminutive Loch Dubh-ghlas and flows northeastwards through Coire Dubh-ghlas, before turning east then southeast amongst extensive conifer plantations to the bridge which carries the A83 road over it. It then turns east at this point and flows into Loch Fyne.
