= Jami Dauber =

American jazz musician and teacher

Jami Dauber is an American jazz musician and teacher. She is the 2nd trumpet in the group Diva Jazz and plays trumpet and flugelhorn in the group Five Play.

After receiving a bachelor's degree in music education from the University of Florida, Dauber earned a Masters in Jazz Studies from the University of North Texas. While at the University of North Texas, she was the first female trumpet player in the One O'Clock Band.

Dauber moved to New York City in 1994 and joined Diva Jazz in 1995. Since 2004 she has also been the band manager. In her freelance work she has appeared on Broadway. Dauber also teaches private lessons and since 1997 has been part of the New York Pops Education Programs.
