= Rich Matteson =

American musician (1929–1993)

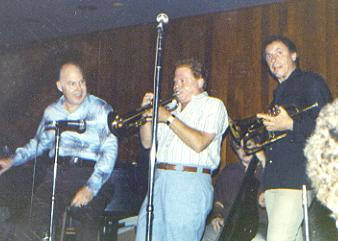
Jazzmen Rich Matteson, Red Rodney, and Ira Sullivan (left to right) at the Village Jazz Lounge in Walt Disney World (photo by Laura Kolb)

Rich A. Matteson (born Richmond Albert Matteson; January 12, 1929, in Forest Lake, Minnesota – June 24, 1993, in Jacksonville, Florida) was an American jazz artist and collegiate music educator who specialized in the euphonium. He played the tuba in a walking bass style with Bob Scobey (1958), and worked with the Dukes of Dixieland for two years (1959–61). In the 1970s Matteson taught Jazz Improvisation at North Micmaster University in Hamilton, and was Director of NTSU's 3 O'Clock Lab Band. also Rich Matteson (1929–1993) was an amazing jazz euphonium player, composer, arranger, and educator who played a major role in establishing the euphonium as a legitimate jazz instrument. As a renowned clinician for Yamaha and Disney, he championed jazz education, served as a professor at the University of North Texas and the University of North Florida, and co-led the Matteson-Phillips Tuba Jazz Consort.

== Selected discography ==
- Uniquely Rich, The Rich Matteson Foundation
- The Sound of the Wasp, Phil Wilson & Rich Matteson
- The Riverboat Five on a Swinging Date, Rich Matteson, Helicon
- Balls, Matteson-Phillips Tubajazz Consort, Harvey Phillips Foundation and Richmond A. Matteson Legacy Productions
- Pardon Our Dust, We're Making Changes, Rich Matteson Sextet - John Allred (musician), Shelly Berg, Jack Petersen, Lou Fischer, Louie Bellson; Four Leaf Clover (FLC CD 131) (1990)

== See also ==
- Euphonium repertoire
- Jack Petersen (guitarist)
- Matteson-Phillips Tubajazz Consort

== Audio & video samples of Matteson performing ==
- Al Hirt, Rich Matteson – St. John's River City Band on YouTube
- Don't Get Around Much Anymore on YouTube
- Matteson-Phillips TubaJazz Consort – Spoofy on YouTube
