= John Allred (musician) =

American jazz trombonist (born 1962)

- Born: 1962 (age 63–64); Rock Island, Illinois, U.S.
- Genres: Jazz, dixieland
- Occupation: Musician
- Instruments: Trombone, tuba, euphonium
- Years active: 1980–present
- Label: Arbors

John Allred (born 1962) is an American jazz trombonist. He is the son of jazz trombonist Bill Allred.

== Career ==
After graduating from high school, Allred moved to Southern California and started his professional music career with the Jazz Minors, a six-piece Dixieland group at Disneyland in Anaheim, California. During this time, he became active in the Los Angeles music scene and, in 1987, accepted an invitation to join Woody Herman and the Young Thundering Herd.

He moved to Orlando, Florida, playing jazz and studio gigs. He was then asked to play in the Harry Connick Jr. Big Band, with whom he toured and performed on numerous recordings and television appearances. In the movie My Girl, he coached actor Dan Aykroyd on how to mimic a tuba player and recorded the tuba parts for the soundtrack. During this time he also took an active role in his father's jazz band, played in numerous production shows, and played euphonium with Rich Matteson and Harvey Phillips in the Matteson-Phillips Tubajazz Consort.

In 1999, Allred moved to New York City and performed with the Toshiko Akiyoshi Big Band, the Woody Herman Orchestra, and the Carnegie Hall Jazz Band.

== Discography ==
- In the Beginning (Arbors, 1993)
- Focused (AppleJazz, 1998)
- Head to Head (Arbors, 2002)
- The ABC's of Jazz (Arbors, 2009)
- Live and Unplugged (2014)

With Warren Vache

- 2008 Jubilation
- 2009 Top Shelf
- 2010 Ballads and Other Cautionary Tales
