= Flagstaff Symphony Orchestra =

Orchestra in Flagstaff, Arizona

- Orchestra
- Former name: Northern Arizona Orchestra
- Founded: 1950
- Location: Flagstaff, Arizona, U.S.
- Concert hall: Ardrey Memorial Auditorium
- Principal conductor: Charles Latshaw
- Music director: Charles Latshaw
- Website: www.flagstaffsymphony.org

The Flagstaff Symphony Orchestra played its first concert in 1950 under the name Northern Arizona Orchestra. It is associated with the non-profit Flagstaff Symphony Association, which was incorporated in 1961. The orchestra currently has at least 75 professional and community members and offers a full annual calendar of events. The primary concert venue is the Ardrey Memorial Auditorium at Northern Arizona University in Flagstaff, Arizona. The artistic director and conductor is Charles Latshaw.

The orchestra is known for popular community offerings which attract a wide audience, including various age demographics. Events like Halloween concerts are especially designed for children.
