= University of North Texas College of Music =

Coordinates: 33.210731°N 97.150501°W

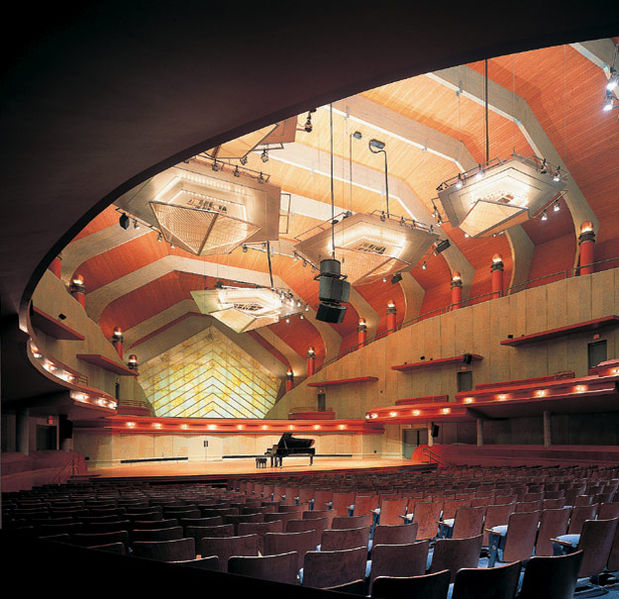
- Winspear Auditorium, Murchison Performing Arts Center, University of North Texas College of Music (photo by Craig D. Blackmon, FAIA, courtesy of Holzman Moss Architecture)

Information
- Type: Public
- Established: 1890
- Dean: John W. Richmond
- Enrollment: 1,510 (2015–16)
- Campus: Suburban
- Website: music.unt.edu

The University of North Texas College of Music, based in Denton, is a comprehensive music school among the largest enrollment of any music institution accredited by the National Association of Schools of Music. It developed the first jazz studies program in the nation, and it remains one of the top schools for jazz. As one of thirteen colleges and schools at the University of North Texas, it has been among the largest music institutions of higher learning in North America since the 1940s. North Texas has been a member of the National Association of Schools of Music for 87 years. Since the 1970s, approximately one-third of all North Texas music students have been enrolled at the graduate level. Music at North Texas dates back to the founding of the university in 1890 when Eliza Jane McKissack, its founding director, structured it as a conservatory.

== Overview ==
The College of Music is a comprehensive institution of international rank. Its heritage dates back one hundred and thirty-six years, when North Texas was founded. The college has one of the largest enrollment of any music institution accredited by the National Association of Schools of Music, of which it has been a member for 87 years. It has been among the largest music institutions of higher learning in North America since the 1940s. The college awards Bachelor of Music, Master of Music, Doctor of Philosophy, and Doctor of Musical Arts degrees and non-degree graduate artist certificates. Concentrations include performance, music composition, music education, music history, music theory, ethnomusicology, and jazz studies. Its size, its array of disciplines organized across eight academic divisions, its six research centers, its six major ensemble areas that produce over 70 ensembles, and the number of degrees offered — from bachelor's degrees to doctorates to artist certificates — allows the college the achieve the type of critical mass to be highly comprehensive (wide and deep) and prolific in academics, research, and performance, from big to small to standard to experimental to esoteric.

In performance, the public review of the college's total work is presented through over 1,000 student and faculty concerts, annually, which include fully mounted opera, grand chorus, symphonic orchestra, early music, chamber music, jazz, orchestra, winds, experimental music, intermedia, and ethno music. The music library, founded in 1941, has one of the largest music collections in the United States, with over 300,000 volumes of books, periodicals, scores, and approximately 900,000 sound recordings. Since the 1970s, approximately one-third of all North Texas music students have been enrolled at the graduate level. North Texas was first in the world to offer a degree in jazz studies. U.S. News & World Report, in its annual America's Best Graduate Schools, ranked the jazz studies program as the best in the country every year from 1994, when it began ranking graduate jazz programs, to 1997, when it retired the category. The One O'Clock Lab Band has been nominated for 7 Grammy Awards.

== Degrees, divisions, and centers ==
The College of Music offers 19 programs leading to degrees and 1 leading to an artist certificate:

=== Divisions ===
Academic and Performance Divisions
Composition Studies	Conducting & Ensembles	Instrumental Studies	Jazz Studies	Keyboard Studies	Music Education	Music History, Theory and Ethnomusicology	Vocal Studies
Departments
	Choral; Conducting	Brass				Ethnomusicology	Opera; Studies
	Early; Music	Percussion				Music; History	Vocal; Studies
	Orchestral; Conducting	Strings				Music; Theory
	Wind; Conducting	Woodwinds

=== Centers ===
Centers for Research and Performance
Center for Chamber Music Studies	Center for Experimental Music and Intermedia (CEMI)	Center for Schenkerian Studies	Texas Center for Music and Medicine

=== Ensemble areas & prime groups ===
Ensemble Areas
Orchestral	Choral	Wind	Composition; Studies	Collegium; Musicum	Jazz
Major Groups (of over 50 Ensembles)
	A Cappella; Choir	Brass; Band	NOVA (new music)	Baroque; Orchestra	Contemporary; Repertory Ensemble
Concert; Orchestra	Chamber; Choir	Concert; Band		Vox Aquilae (formerly Collegium Singers)	Jazz; Guitar Labs
Symphony Orchestra	Collegium; Singers	Green Brigade; Marching Band		Baroque Ensemble	Jazz Repertory; Ensemble
	Concert; Choir	Wind Symphony			Jazz; Singers I & II
	Grand Chorus	Symphonic; Band			Jazz; Strings
	Men's; Chorus	Wind; Ensemble			Jazz Trombone; Ensemble "The U-Tubes"
	Recital; Choir				Lab; Bands (9)
	Opera; Workshop

== Former deans & current dean ==
1890–1891
Eliza Jane McKissack (née Aykroyd) (aka Mrs. Alexander Cogle McKissack) (1828–1900) served as Director of what then was called Conservatory of Music, part of what then was the Texas Normal College and Teacher Training Institute, which was established as a private institution in 1890. Classes were first held Tuesday, September 16, 1890.
1891–1892
Mary Francis Long, from Geneva, Illinois, was an 1891 graduate of Chicago Musical College where, during her senior year, she won the William M. Hoyt Prize (the Diamond Medal for the best student in harmony in the graduating class)
1894–?
Sarah ("Sallie") Frances Thornley (née Cummings) (b. 1854 Mason County, Kentucky; d. 11 July 1921 Dallas, Texas; buried at the I.O.O.F. Cemetery, Denton, Texas) — was originally from Maysville, Kentucky. Around 1883 (ending January 1884), Thornley had been a music teacher at Georgetown Female Seminary in Georgetown, Kentucky. In January 1884, Thornley enrolled at the College of Music of Cincinnati. In Maysville, Thornley taught music and was the organist at M. E. Church, South. In the spring of 1885, Thornley had served as head of music at a college in Sherman, Texas. Around 1887, Thornley had been a music teacher at Georgetown College in Georgetown, Kentucky.
1894–?
Miss Edith Miller
1896–1897

Celia Goldsmith

1901–1902
Mary Stuart Butler (23 March 1871 Kirkwood, Missouri — 29 November 1944 San Marcos, Texas) was the first music faculty of record after North Texas became a state institution in 1899. She was appointed by the Texas State Board of Education on July 6, 1901. She was a vocal instructor who led a lifetime advocacy of music in public schools, not just for "intellectual luxury and restful agency," but for cultural and practical uses ranging from physiological development to self-expression to public speaking (enunciation, tones). Prior to North Texas, Butler had overseen music education in the Austin Public Schools. After North Texas, she held positions at Texas State University in San Marcos (then a teachers college) and Louisiana Tech University.
1902–1912
Margaret Manora Boylan (born 1867, Hubbard, Iowa; d 1963, Carthage, Missouri) served as director of music and reading. Before beginning a career of teaching on the faculties of several colleges throughout the country, she had attended summer school at Ginn summer school in Chicago, New England Conservatory ("NEC"), and Teachers College, Columbia University. And, she was a published composer.
- At the New England Conservatory, she had studied three semesters from 1901 to 1902. At NEC, she studied piano with Edward Danforth Hale (1859–1945) and voice with William L. Whitney (1861–1949) and Alena G. Emerson. She took both piano and voice for all three semesters. In addition she took two semesters of Harmony with Harry Newton Redman (1869–1958) and two semesters of Music in Public School with Samuel Winkley Cole (1848–1926). She did not earn a diploma from New England Conservatory.
- At Teachers College, she received a Departmental Certificate in Music Education on November 25, 1915. She also took a couple of classes.
1914–1915
Harry Milton Snow (b. 19 Sept 1879, Big Lake, Minnesota; d. 23 Apr. 1954, Los Angeles) studied music at the New England Conservatory from the first semester of 1905 (Fall 1904) through the second semester of 1909 and then for two more semesters in 1912 (when he studied only cello with Virginia Stickney (later known as Mrs. Frances Williams Snow; 1886–1972). Harry Snow graduated June 22, 1909, with a diploma in voice as a teacher. His voice teachers were Arthur Dwight Babcock (1875–1970) and Charles Adams White (1856–1928). He also studied piano for seven semesters with Alfred Pietro Angelo Devoto (born 1875). In addition he studied solfège, Italian, drama, music history, music theory, analysis, English, harmony, French, German, school music, and vocal teaching (called Normal Department).
1917–1938
Lillian May Parrill (1881–1973) served as Director of what then was a Music Department. North Texas announced her appointment as a new faculty member July 15, 1915. In addition to heading the department, she conducted the chorus, which, in 1929, had 103 members. The next year, 1930, under her direction, the chorus expanded to 150. Parrill was originally from Vincennes, Indiana. Parrill was a 1913 graduate of the American Institute of Normal Methods, Northwestern University, Evanston, Illinois. From 1912 to 1914, she was supervisor of public school music in Elwood, Indiana; from 1914 to 1915, she studied voice with Oscar Saenger (1868–1929) in New York; during the summer of 1911, she studied voice with Charles Washburn in Chautauqua, New York; and during the summer of 1918, she studied voice with John Dennis Mehan in New York In July 1941, in Denton, she married Fred Otis Grissom (1876–1978). She resigned as Associate Professor in September 1941 and henceforth lived in Kinmundy, Illinois, with her husband. She died June 10, 1973, in Kinmundy, Illinois. Mary Anderson, professor of piano at North Texas, was Perrill's sister. Anderson, a 1909 and 1911 graduate of Baylor University had studied from 1913 to 1914 at the Royal Conservatory of Music in Leipzig and in 1918 and again from 1920 to 1921 with Oliver Denton in New York.
1938–1947
Wilfred Conwell Bain (1908–1997) built the School of Music into one of the largest in the country. By 1940, North Texas was the largest state supported teachers college in the world. Bain was appointed in 1938 as head of what then was a "deanless" school of music. In 1945, when what then was North Texas State Teachers College became North Texas State College — a name change that reflected broader offerings — an administrative reorganization gave the School of Music its own dean, which was filled by Bain. He founded and directed the School's A Cappella Choir and the Opera Workshop. The A Cappella Choir, one of dozens of the school's performing groups, performed over 500 concerts in five states between 1940 and 1945. In 1945, the choir performed several tours for civilian and Army groups in Texas in camps to promote bond sales and entertain sick and wounded service personnel.
1947–1958
Walter Hutchinson Hodgson (1904–1988), conductor of the school's Symphony Orchestra and founding conductor of the Madrigal Singers, and a sacred music scholar, approved (as acting Dean) in 1947 Gene Hall's proposal for a bachelor's degree in "Dance Band," the first jazz studies degree offered in the world. In 1958, Dr. Hodgson accepted an offer to become Dean of the Michigan State University School of Music.
1958–1974
Kenneth Neil Cuthbert (1917–1984), who, in addition to serving as dean, was a choral and instrumental conductor. Cuthbert earned a Bachelor of Music in 1940 and a Master of Music in 1942 from the University of Wisconsin. He also earned a Master of Arts in 1946 and a Doctor of Education in 1947 from Teachers College, Columbia University. From 1951 to 1958, Cuthbert had served on the faculty at East Carolina University and from 1948 to 1951 he had served as Dean of the School of Music at Illinois Wesleyan University. Also prior to his North Texas tenure, he had served as Vice President of the National Association of Schools of Music for three years.
1974–1987
Marceau Chevalier Myers (1929–1987), a scholar of American orchestral composers with a strong affinity for Charles Ives, oversaw a surge in enrollment that made the school the nation's second largest within a major university. Myers also spearheaded the planning and completion of the a new Music Complex that had been initiated under Dean Cuthbert. Under Myers' leadership, the school gained greater international acclaim from an expanded touring initiative by several music ensembles – tours that included Western Europe, Russia, South America, and the Far East.
1987–1988
Stephen Thomas Farish Jr. (1936–1995), (Interim Dean) was a singer (baritone) and professor of voice. He earned his DMA from the University of Illinois in 1962 and, that same year, joined the UNT faculty.
1988–1991
Robert Blocker (UNT MM 70 DMA 72) (born 1946) is the current dean of the Yale School of Music (a graduate school)
1991–1992
Stephen Thomas Farish Jr. (1936–1995) (Interim Dean)
1992–1996
David Lewis Shrader (born 1939), a percussionist and composer, served as Dean for 7 years. In 1996, the UNT Chancellor asked Shrader to serve as Interim Director of Development for the University. The former Director had died. Shrader obliged, serving for one year. Dr. Will May stepped-in as Interim Dean for one year.
1996–1997
William "Will" Vernon May Jr. (UNT MME 75) (Interim Dean)
1997–1999
David Lewis Shrader, oversaw the opening of the Murchison Performing Arts Center in February 1999 – a 40-year institutional objective.
1999–2000
William "Will" Vernon May Jr. (UNT MME '75) (Interim Dean)
2000–2001
Thomas Clark (born 1949), a composer and trombonist, and now UNT Professor Emeritus, served once as Interim Dean of the College of Music.
2001–2015
James Copeland Scott (born 1943) is a flutist, pianist, and music theory scholar who has researched structural relationship between Schoenberg and Brahms.
2016–2016
Warren Henry, Interim Dean January 2016, following Scott's retirement December 2015.
2016–Present
John W. Richmond, Dean August 1, 2016. Prior to his appointment, Richmond served as Professor and Director of the Glenn Korff School of Music at the University of Nebraska-Lincoln (UNL; 2003-2016) and as Professor and in various administrative appointments in the School of Music at the University of South Florida-Tampa (USF; 1987-2003). He earned a bachelor's degree in music education from William Jewell College, a master's degree in choral conducting from the Conservatory of Music at the University of Missouri at Kansas City, and a Ph.D. degree in music education from Northwestern University. Richmond's research focuses on arts education policy, legal issues in arts education, and the philosophy of music education.

Notes:
Frank Douglas Mainous (1918–2007), a composer, music theory scholar, and director of military bands during World War II, served as interim dean at least twice. He was married to concert pianist and faculty member Jean Mainous, née Harris. He earned a Master of Music degree from the Eastman School of Music in 1941.

== Selected history ==
- 1890 — when the University of North Texas was founded – music was a part of the curriculum. What then was a teachers college offered a "Conservatory Music Course" as part of the initial "Nine Full Courses." The complete course in music, lasting forty-four weeks, required private lessons that had to be paid for, in addition to regular school tuition. Tuition for these classes was $200 for the complete course, while regular tuition for a forty-week school year was only $48. The founding president, Joshua Crittenden Chilton (1853–1896), taught the first classes in the history of music and the theory of sound. John M. Moore, a Dallas Methodist bishop and teacher of mathematics and engineering courses, taught the classes in voice culture and harmony. Mrs. Eliza Jane McKissack was also a teacher of music and may have served as the director of the music conservatory.
- 1939 — North Texas became an associate member of the National Association of Schools of Music
- 1940 — North Texas became a full member of the National Association of Schools of Music
- 1941 — The National Association of Schools of Music approved graduate studies in music at North Texas
- 1950 — The School of Music began offering its first degrees leading to a Doctor of Philosophy in the areas of musicology, composition, and theory.
- 1960 — The oldest existing part of the current Music Building opens, along with Voertman Concert Hall.
- 1968 — The Texas Higher Education Coordinating Board approved degrees leading to a Doctor of Musical Arts
- 1975 — Most of the current Music building opens.
- 1989 — The School of Music restructured itself as a "college of music," reflecting nearly 60 years of size and breadth of many disciplines in the music arts. The school leadership had long contemplated restructuring as a conservatory, but felt that a well-functioning college model, tailored specifically for North Texas, gave the entire university latitude to exploit the best of several models that included academic research, performance, composition, training music educators and music school administrators, and other areas – and it preserved a streamline of cross-discipline of all areas within the College of Music and within the university. The College of Music has enjoyed close collaboration with other Colleges within the University (e.g., English faculty and students collaborating with composers, physics faculty and students collaborating with several divisions in areas that included musical acoustics, electronic music). Despite the high caliber of student musicianship and seriousness of all the programs, the College of Music is accessible in many areas to non-music majors.

== See also ==
Category:University of North Texas College of Music alumni
Category:University of North Texas College of Music faculty
