= Alice Barnett (composer) =

American composer (1886–1975)

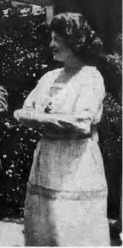
- Barnett in 1920
- Born: Alice Ray Barnett Price Stevenson; 26 May, 1886; Lewistown, Illinois
- Died: 25 August, 1975 (aged 89); San Diego, California
- Occupations: Music teacher, composer

Alice Ray Barnett Price Stevenson (May 26, 1886 – August 25, 1975) was an American composer and music teacher. She wrote 60 art songs, 49 of which were published between 1906 and 1932.

== Early life and education ==
Alice Barnett was born on May 26, 1886 in Lewistown, Illinois, the daughter of Orrin Barnett, a piano teacher and choir director. Her mother died while she was only a year old. She displayed musical talent early, singing at age 4 and playing instruments at age 6. When she was older, she went to live in Chicago, Illinois with her maternal grandfather, Simeon P. Shope, Chief Justice of the Illinois Supreme Court. With his support, she attended Chicago Musical College. There she studied with Rudolf Ganz and Felix Borowski and graduated with honors in 1906. She then studied at the American Conservatory of Music in Chicago under Heniot Levy, Wilhelm Middleschulte, and Adolf Weidig.

Shope paid for Barnett to study in Europe, and she departed in 1909, accompanied by a chaperone, married singer Minnie Fish-Griffin. Barnett studied composition in Berlin with Hugo Kaun. The next year, she married American violin student Samuel H. Price and abandoned her studies, much to Kaun's dismay.

== San Diego years ==
Barnett and Price settled in his hometown, San Diego, California. They had two sons and divorced in 1914.

Barnett spent the rest of her life in San Diego. From 1917 to 1926, she was a music teacher at San Diego High School. In 1926, she retired from teaching and married Dr. George Ray Stevenson. The Stevenson home became a center for local recitals and visiting musicians and composers. She was active in numerous civic organizations, including the San Diego Orchestra Association, the San Diego Civic Symphony Orchestra, the Amphion Club, the Music Makers, the Musical Merit Foundation, the Civic Music Association, the Community Concert Association, the San Diego Opera Guild, and the Browning Society.

Barnett died on 25 August 1975 in San Diego.

== Work ==
She began publishing her work in 1906 with her song This Day for Thee, published by a family friend. In 1908 and 1909, Chicago publisher C. F. Summy published seven more of her songs.

Violinist Efrem Zimbalist heard Barnett's work and brought it to the attention of G. Schirmer, Inc. The company published 33 of Barnett's songs between 1916 and 1932. The first was Serenade (1916), dedicated to Zimbalist's wife Alma Gluck and one of a number of songs Barnett would compose that were musical settings of works by Clinton Scollard. Serenade was the first work to draw serious critical attention to Barnett.

Barnett's work is often described as colorful and exotic. Her most important work was In a Gondola (1920), an eight-song setting of the twelve-part poem by Robert Browning about two lovers in 16th century Venice. Tenor Melvin Brown recorded it for a 1942 record. Other notable works by Barnett include Panels from a Chinese Screen (1924), a three-song setting of a work by Frederic Mertz, a San Diego poet who collaborated with Barnett on at least ten other songs.

Barnett largely stopped composing in the 1930s and left numerous unpublished works.
