= Amy Ellerman =

American contralto and voice teacher

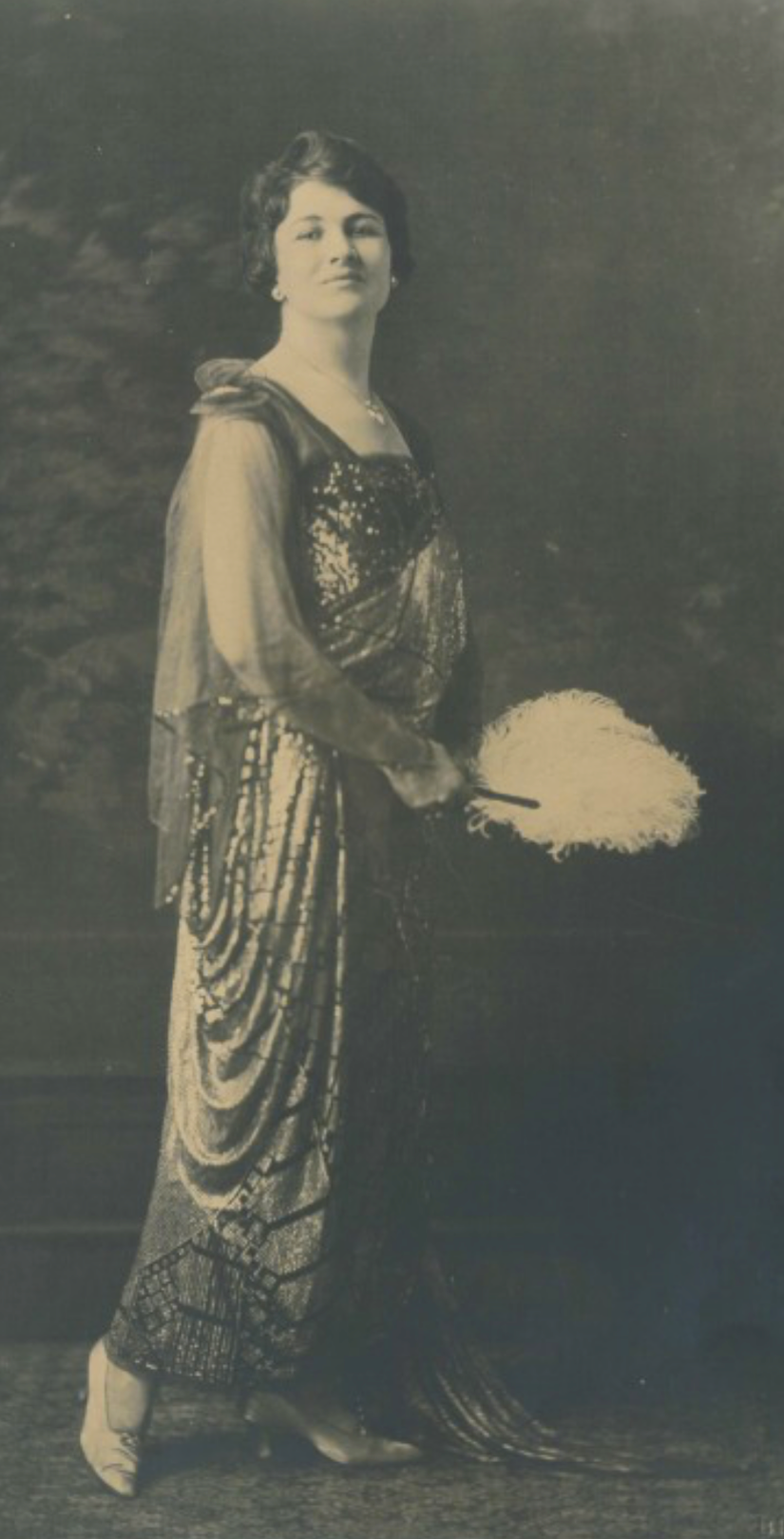
Amy Ellerman

Amy Ellerman, born May Ellerman, (July 22 1887, Yankton, South Dakota – June 4, 1960, New York City) was an American contralto and voice teacher. She had an active concert career from the 1910s through the 1940s; most often appearing in oratorios and other works from the concert repertoire. She made many recordings for Edison Records from 1916 through 1929; including performing as a member of the Homestead Trio and the "We Girls" Quartet. She was a longtime contralto soloist at First Presbyterian Church in Manhattan, and worked as a voice teacher in New York City. She trained several Hollywood actresses to sing for their work in film, including Irene Dunne and Lynne Carver.

== Early life and education ==
The daughter of Herman Ellerman and Emilie Rudolph, May Ellerman was born on July 22, 1887 in Yankton, South Dakota. Her name was given as Amy E. Ellerman as part of the graduating class of Yankton High School in 1906. That same year she graduated with a diploma in music from the conservatory at Yankton College where she trained as a pianist under her primary teacher Lee N. Daily. She joined the piano faculty at that institution in 1907. Newspaper coverage of the school's faculty referred to her as Emily Amy Ellerman at this time.

In September 1909 Yankton College announced that Ellerman was taking a sabbatical to study both piano and voice in Chicago. There she pursued studies at the American Conservatory of Music (ACM) where she completed her graduate degree in 1911. Her voice teacher at the ACM was soprano Ragna Linné. While a graduate student she worked as a paid church singer at the Pilgram Congregational Church. She returned home to Yankton briefly in December 1909 to appear as the contralto soloist in Handel's Messiah with the Yankton Choral Union. She gave a recital with Adolf Weidig, Heniot Levy, and Louise Robyn at Kimball Hall in Chicago in February 1910.

Ellerman continued vocal training during her career both in the United States and abroad. Some of the voice teachers she studied under included Holmes Cowper, Gemma Bellincioni, William Wade Hinshaw and Herbert Witherspoon.

== Career ==
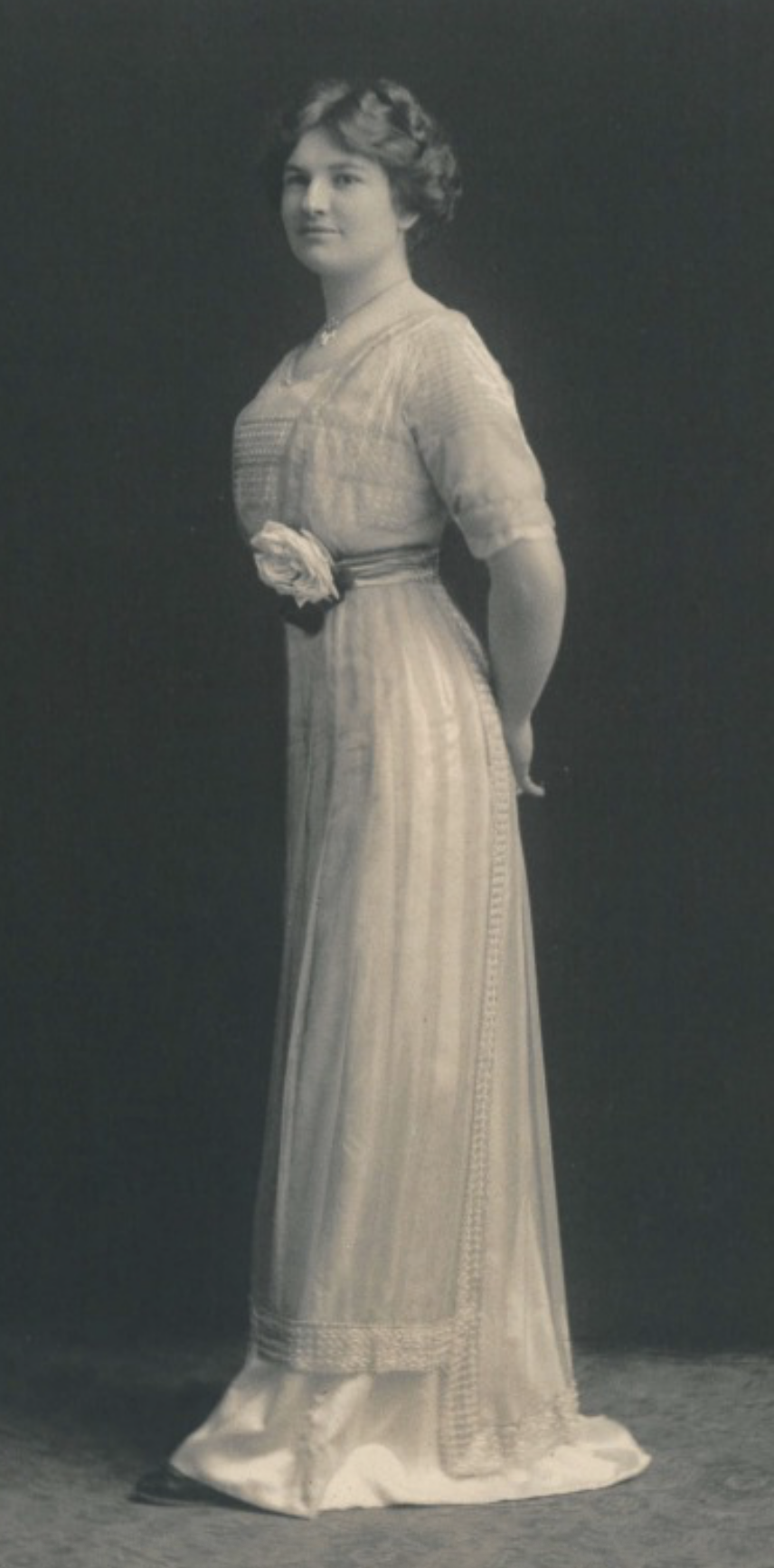
Amy Ellerman

After completing her studies in Chicago she went to Berlin to pursue vocal training, and began her career as a concert singer in Germany in 1914. She made her opera debut at the Semperoper in Dresden around this time, but came back to the United States in the midst of World War I where by May 1915 she was working as an oratorio and concert contralto. While she did not appear in operas in America, she did sing the role of Amneris in a concert performance of Aida with J. N. Adam Company in Buffalo, New York in 1915. She was part of a resident quartet of soloists at the Chautauqua Institution in August 1915 whose other member included soprano Marie Kaiser, bass Edmund A. Jahn, and tenor Calvin Coxe. Ellerman later married Coxe in 1917. Their marriage ended upon Coxe's death on December 17, 1934.

Ellerman made many recordings for Edison Records from 1916 through 1929. These are catalogued in the Discography of American Historical Recordings. She made several of these for Edison Disc Records as a member of the all-female Homestead Trio from 1917-1923. Their first record, "Indiana", was one of the top selling records for the label. She also recorded as a member of another all-women group, the "We Girls" Quartet. She also toured with Thomas Alva Edison to assist him in making demonstrations of his recording technology. In these demonstrations she would sing along with recordings of her own voice and then stop suddenly so that listeners could hear how well the recordings matched her real singing voice.

Ellerman had an active career as a concert and oratorio singer on the national stage. Oratorios and concert pieces in which she performed as a soloist included Felix Mendelssohn's Elijah, Handel's Messiah, and Bach's Mass in B minor. Some of the ensembles she performed with during her solo career included the Boston Symphony Orchestra, the New York Symphony Orchestra, Minneapolis Symphony Orchestra, the Bach Choir of Bethlehem, the Oratorio Society of New York, the Washington Heights Oratorio Society, and the Bach Cantata Club among other organizations. She was also active as a recitalist; including a 1922 recital at Aeolian Hall and a 1930 recital at The Town Hall in New York City. Howard Taubman wrote the following in his review in The New York Times of her singing in a second recital at The Town Hall in 1936:

"Amy Ellerman, who appeared in recital at the Town Hall last night, is the possessor of a voice that has few peers in this country. It is an opulent, full-blooded contralto, velvety in texture and prodigal in amplitude. For those who can respond to the sheer beauty of a voice as voice, Miss Ellerman's singing is a source of constant pleasure.

Ellerman worked for twenty-six years as the contralto soloist at First Presbyterian Church in Manhattan. In 1947 she sang two hymns at the funeral of former New York governor Charles Seymour Whitman. In addition to her work as a singer, she also worked as voice teacher; notably training several Hollywood actresses, including Irene Dunne and Lynne Carver. One of her other notable pupils was soprano Barbara Thorne Stevenson. She was also an active member of the New York Singing Teachers' Association, and was several years the vice-president of that organization. She was also active with the Professional Sacred Singers and the National Association of Teachers of Singing, and was a judge for several professional singing competitions.

Amy Ellerman died from a heart attack at the age of 71 at her home in New York City on June 4, 1960.
