= Grace Welsh =

American pianist, composer, and educator

- Born: 1895; Boone, Iowa, U.S.
- Died: June 15, 1999 (aged 103–104); Boone, Iowa, U.S.
- Occupation(s): Pianist, composer, and educator

Grace Welsh (1895 – June 15, 1999) was an American pianist, composer, and educator. Welsh was the first person to receive a master's degree in piano from Juilliard School. She taught piano for more than 60 years.

== Personal life and early career ==
Welsh was born to Matthew and Alice Jordan Welsh in Boone, Iowa, in 1895. She began learning to play the piano when she was eight years old, attending Sacred Heart School in Boone and the Lakeview Musical Society upon graduation from high school. Welsh graduated from Rosary College in River Forest, Illinois and attended the American Conservatory of Music in Chicago, Illinois, for musical composition under Adolf Weidig and piano under Silvio Scionti. She later attended the University of Chicago, Loyola University Chicago, and DePaul University. After receiving Juilliard School fellowships for piano and musical composition under Rosina Lhévinne and Rubin Goldmark, she was the first person to receive a master's degree in piano from that school, and was later an assistant instructor there. In 1919, Welsh became a teacher of piano and theory at the American Conservatory of Music.

== Professional career ==
In 1922, Welsh first appeared as a professional pianist and composer in Chicago when she played her Sonata for Violin and Piano in E minor alongside violinist Hans Muenzer. The sonata was also performed by the violinists Ebba Sundstrom Nylander and Stella Roberts. During the same year, Welsh held a piano recital as a tribute to her former teacher from when she taught at the American Conservatory of Music. She later played her Sonata in B minor for Violin and Piano with violinist Michael de Stefano, who was part of the New York Philharmonic. In 1930, Welsh performed a recital in New York. In 1931, she was a soloist as part of the Woman's Symphony Orchestra of Chicago. She performed with the Musical Arts club, which contained 40 women, in Wausau, Wisconsin, in 1938. Welsh taught piano for more than 60 years. She was the associate director at the American Conservatory of Music. At one point, Welsh turned down becoming president of the American Conservatory of Music due to thinking that it would get in the way of her teaching music.

== Later life and death ==
She retired from the American Conservatory in 1981, and the Grace Welsh Prize for Piano competition is held there every year in the spring. The competition is funded by donations from Welsh's former students. Welsh was inducted into the Chicago Senior Citizens' Hall of Fame when she turned 100 years old. A yearly piano recital, which included some of her former students, was held for her at a Park Ridge, Illinois retirement home. Welsh died on June 15, 1999, in Park Ridge at a retirement home. She was buried in Boone, Iowa.
