= Symphony No. 7 in A major =

The following notable composers have written a Symphony No. 7 in A Major:

- Ludwig van Beethoven's Symphony No. 7, Op. 92 (1811–2)
- Max Trapp Symphony No. 7, Op. 55
