= Madalyn Akers Phillips =

American composer

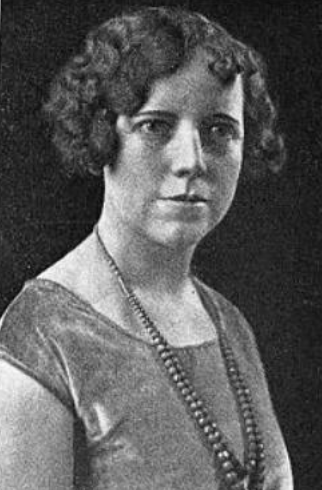
- Madalyn Akers, later Phillips, from a 1927 publication
- Born: Maddalena Marie Heryer; August 1889; Hutchinson, Kansas, U.S.
- Died: August 24, 1949 (age 60); San Diego, California, U.S.
- Other names: Madalyn Heryer Akers, Madalyn Heryer Phillips
- Occupation(s): Composer, organist

Madalyn Akers Phillips (August 1889 – August 24, 1949), born Maddalena Marie Heryer, was an American composer and organist.

== Early life and education ==
Heryer was born in Hutchinson, Kansas, the daughter of David Heryer and Ida May Sperry Heryer. Both of her parents were musical and they identified her musical talents at an early age. She attended Knox Conservatory of Music, and earned a master's degree in composition from the American Conservatory of Music in 1927, under the supervision of Adolf Weidig.

== Career ==
Akers Phillips began giving recitals and performing her compositions as a young woman. She was a church organist in Kansas City, Missouri. She gave concerts on organ, including a 1936 performance in Riverside, California, and 1946 and 1947 benefit concerts in Chula Vista, California, the latter with actor William Farnum.

Akers was featured on "Meet the Composer", a radio program about California composers, in 1932. Compositions by Akers Phillips were featured in 1939 at a festival in California, sponsored by the Native Composers Society, alongside works by Charles Wakefield Cadman and Nathaniel Dett, among others. She chaired a benefit concert for the Red Cross in 1942 in Chula Vista, and a musicale of the Musical Merit Foundation in San Diego in 1946.

She was a member of the Order of the Eastern Star, and southern district president of the National Federation of Music Clubs.

== Compositions ==
"Her work ranges in character from simple but charming cradle songs to the dignity of orchestral selections, difficult arrangements for pipe organ and piano," explained a 1945 article about Akers Phillips. "Her songs both secular and sacred have been sung in leading churches and concert platforms of the country by famous church and concert singers."

- "The Fraternity Waltz" (1908)
- "A Hunting Song" (lyrics by Sir Walter Scott)
- "Song Without Words"
- "Gypsy Suite"
- "Clouds in the Moonlight" (1940, dedicated to Edna Scotten Billings)
- "The Rock-a-by Train" (1941, lyrics by Florence Williams Brantley)
- "Igor's Song" (1942, dedicated to Lawrence Tibbett)
- "I Cannot Weep" (1942, dedicated to Dusolina Giannini)
- "Thank God for America" (1942)
- "The Fiesta of the Moon" (1947)
- "Chula Vista, Where Dreams Come True" (1947)
- "Abraham Lincoln Walks at Midnight" (lyrics by Vachel Lindsay)
- "Holdin' Yo' Hand in the Dark" (lyrics by Curtis Burnley Railing)
- "Postscript"
- "Because it Knows"
- "California Suite"
- "He is Risen, as He Said"

== Personal life ==
Heryer married William Fred Akers in 1915; he died in 1930. She married again in 1937, to California businessman William S. Phillips. She died in 1949, at the age of 60, in San Diego, California.
