= Lucy Scarbrough =

American pianist (1927–2020)

Lucy Scarbrough (born Ardans June 26, 1927 – June 13, 2020) was an American pianist, conductor and educator. She taught at El Paso Community College (EPCC), and founded the El Paso Chopin Piano Festival in El Paso, Texas.

== Biography ==
Lucy (née Ardans) Scarbrough was born in Encino, New Mexico. She was one of ten children, and also the youngest. She studied piano first with her mother, then with American pianist and teacher, Silvio Scionti, and later with Russian pianist, Maurice Lichtman. As a teenager, she discovered her lifelong love of the music of Frédéric Chopin. Scarbrough attended the American Conservatory of Music in Chicago where she earned her doctorate, and studied with pianists such as Leo Sowerby. Following her studies at the Conservatory, Scarbrough went on to teach at the Chicago Musical College, and there continued her piano studies with the famous Rudolph Ganz, noted, among other things, for being the first concert pianist in the United States to feature the work of Maurice Ravel.

Following her marriage to Paul Scarbrough, they moved to Albuquerque, New Mexico, where she taught at St. Pius X High School. She also founded the Albuquerque Interparochial Choir, and served as music director for the Albuquerque Light Opera Company. With her family, Scarbrough moved one last time to El Paso, Texas, where she founded the EPCC music department, Opera a la Carte (El Paso Opera) company, and the El Paso Civic Orchestra. Scarbrough worked as the conductor of the civic orchestra for 30 years. Scarbrough continued teaching at EPCC through the spring semester of 2020.

Most notably, Lucy Scarbrough was the founder of the El Paso Chopin Festival, for which she received international recognition. In 2019, the Ministry of Culture and National Heritage of the Republic of Poland awarded her the Meritorious for Polish Culture medal, in recognition of her achievements in promoting the music of Frédéric Chopin to American audiences.

Lucy Scarbrough received numerous other awards during her career such as the Minnie Stevens Piper higher education award of Texas, the National Teaching Excellence Award of the University of Texas at Austin, and the Hispanic Heritage award in 2014. She was inducted into the El Paso Women's Hall of Fame in 1996.

Lucy Scarbrough died in her home in El Paso, Texas.
