= Ragna Linne =

Norwegian soprano (1862-1934)

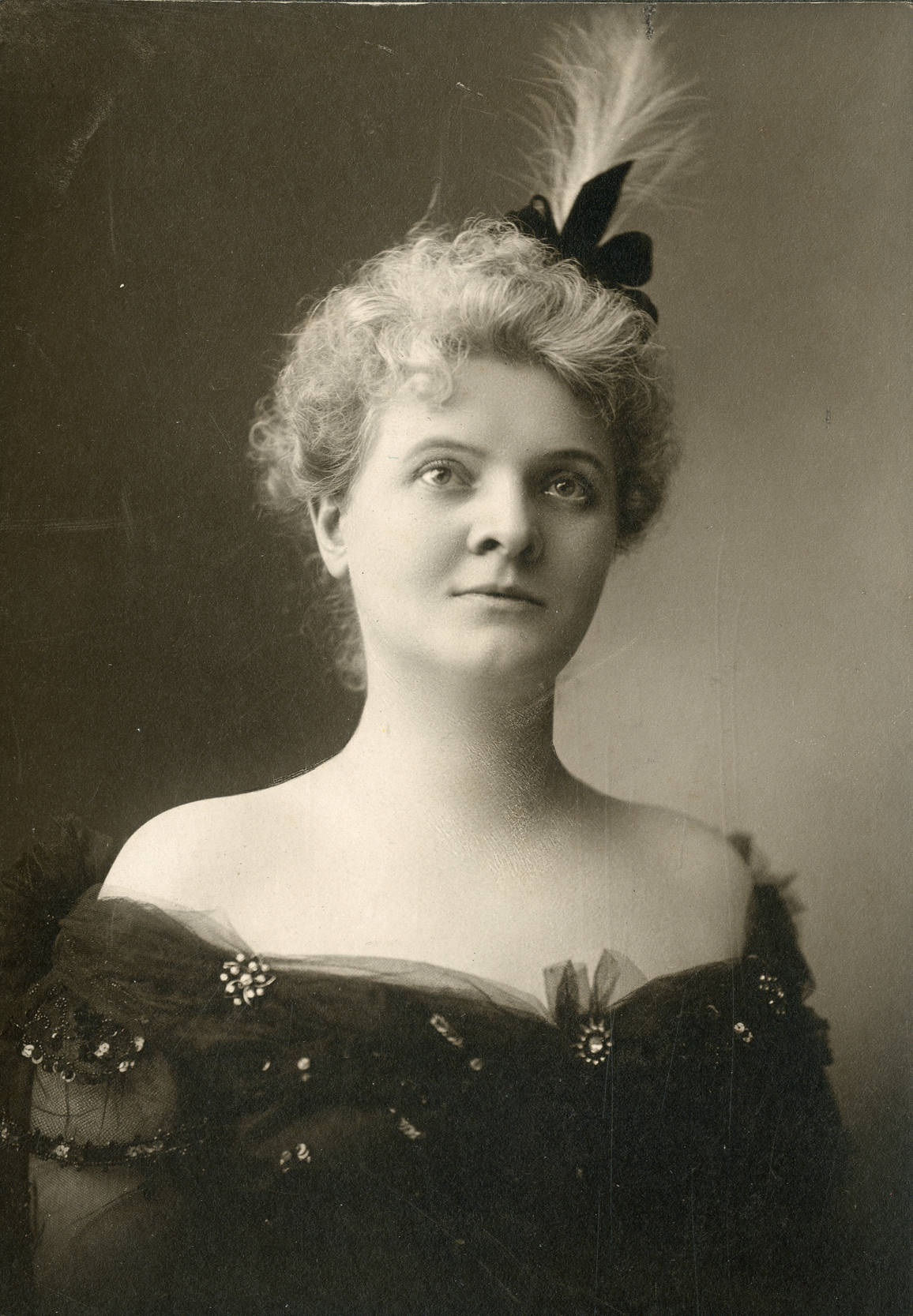
- Born: October 9, 1862; Oslo, Norway
- Died: December 25, 1934 (aged 72); California, U.S.
- Other names: Ragna Linné Strobel
- Occupations: Soprano, concert singer

Ragna Sofie Linne (October 9, 1862 – December 25, 1934) was a Norwegian soprano and voice teacher. She was a soloist with the Chicago Symphony Orchestra and taught at the American Conservatory of Music. She was also one of the first Scandinavians to become a member of the Bahá'í faith.

== Early life and education ==
Linne was born in Oslo, the daughter of Karen Linne. She was often described as a descendant of Carl Linnaeus. She studied voice with Mathilde Marchesi in Paris.

== Career ==
Linne began her performing career in Norway in 1882, and began teaching students in Oslo in 1884. She traveled to the United States where she made her first appearance in America at Turn Hall in Boston on March 28, 1886. The following June she performed as the soprano soloist in a concert of a truncated version of Gioachino Rossini's Stabat Mater with the Boston Oratorio Society. She made her Broadway debut on August 16, 1886 at the Bijou Opera House as Legrand Foudre in Owen Westford, Susie Russell, and George Scheiffarth's musical Soldiers and Sweethearts. At the time of her New York debut in 1886 The New York Times reported that she had previously appeared on the opera stage at La Scala in Milan.

She moved to Chicago by 1891, and sang Norwegian folk songs at the Chicago World's Fair in 1893. She was president of the Chicago Artists' Associations. She gave recitals, and toured as a soloist with the Chicago Symphony Orchestra.

Linne taught at the American Conservatory of Music in Chicago. One of her students there was singer Amy Ellerman. Linne and her students sang for the patients at the South Dakota State Insane Hospital in Yankton in 1913. She was an honorary member of Mu Phi Epsilon.

Linne was one of the first Scandinavians to become a member of the Bahá'í faith. She sang at Chicago Bahá'í conventions 1912 and 1914. She made a sound recording of the Bahá'í Benediction in 1923. Later in life, Linne performed and taught in the Los Angeles area. Metropolitan Opera soprano Harriet Henders was one of her pupils in Los Angeles.

== Personal life ==
Linne married lithographer Theodore Strobel. They had a daughter, Norma, who died in Chicago in 1902. Theodore Strobel died in 1905. She moved to southern California in the 1920s, and died there in 1934, at the age of 72.
