= Arthur Dunham =

American musician (1875–1938)

- Born: William Arthur Dunham; March 8, 1875; Bloomington, Illinois, U.S.
- Died: January 24, 1938 (aged 62) Chicago, Illinois, U.S.
- Genres: Classical, synagogue music
- Occupations: Organist, conductor, composer, music educator
- Instruments: Organ, piano
- Years active: c. 1896–1938

William Arthur Dunham (March 8, 1875 – January 24, 1938) was an American organist, conductor, composer, and music educator based in Chicago. Known professionally as Arthur Dunham, he served as organist at major Chicago religious institutions including Chicago Sinai Congregation, Kehilath Anshe Ma'ariv (KAM) Temple, and the First Methodist Temple. He founded and conducted the Philharmonic Orchestra of Chicago (1917), led the Apollo Musical Club and Mendelssohn Club, and conducted the Boston English Opera Company. His synagogue compositions, including settings of the Bar'chu, remain in use.

== Early life and education ==
Dunham was born in Bloomington, Illinois, to John B. Dunham (1832–1908), a railroad freight agent from Ripley, Ohio, and Minnie Hoyt (1844–1921), a German immigrant. Though christened "William," he was known throughout his life as Arthur. The 1880 U.S. Census lists him as "Willie" at age five in Bloomington.

Dunham received his musical training from two of the most distinguished organists of the era. In Chicago, he studied organ with Clarence Eddy (1851–1937), one of America's most celebrated concert organists, who had inaugurated over 100 organs and toured extensively in Europe and America. He subsequently traveled to Paris to study with Charles-Marie Widor (1844–1937), the legendary French organist-composer who served at Saint-Sulpice for 64 years. A testimonial from Widor was noted when Dunham gave recitals at Knox Church in Winnipeg, Manitoba, in 1906 and 1914.

== Career ==
=== Church and synagogue positions ===
Dunham held organist positions at several prominent Chicago institutions throughout his career:

At Chicago Sinai Congregation, a Reform synagogue, he served as organist and director of music, composing his "Morning Services for the Synagogue" (1908), which he dedicated to the renowned Rabbi Emil G. Hirsch.

He later moved to KAM Temple (Kehilath Anshe Ma'ariv), where he served as organist until his death in 1938. His passing directly led to the hiring of Max Janowski, who happened to be in Chicago conducting a musical pageant. Janowski would serve KAM for over 50 years and become one of the most important Jewish liturgical composers of the twentieth century.

At the First Methodist Temple (Chicago Temple), the "skyscraper church," Dunham achieved much of his renown as an organist. When the building was constructed in 1924, he was engaged to help select the organ, which had four manuals and 6,300 pipes. He was subsequently appointed organist.

Earlier positions included Leavitt Street Congregational Church in Chicago.

=== Orchestral and choral conducting ===
In 1917, Dunham organized the Philharmonic Orchestra of Chicago to present popular symphony concerts, making orchestral music accessible to broader audiences beyond the elite subscription concerts of the Chicago Symphony Orchestra. This was a separate organization from the Chicago Symphony (founded 1891) and unrelated to the modern Chicago Philharmonic (founded 1988).

By 1920, he served as conductor of the Apollo Musical Club, a choral society founded in 1872 and one of Chicago's oldest musical organizations. The Apollo performed annually with the Chicago Symphony Orchestra and had sung at the World's Columbian Exposition in 1893. He also conducted the Mendelssohn Club of Chicago.

Other conducting positions included the Symphony Orchestra of the Tivoli Theatre (1922), the Association of Commerce Glee Club (which he led for nearly 25 years), and the Lyric Glee Club of Milwaukee (11 years).

=== Opera ===
In 1921, Dunham served as a conductor of the Boston English Opera Company, an opera company that performed works in English translation as part of a movement to make opera more accessible to American audiences.

=== Teaching ===
Dunham taught at several of Chicago's leading music institutions. He was listed among the faculty of the Chicago National College of Music in 1898, and later taught at the American Conservatory of Music, Bush Conservatory, and the Chicago Philharmonic Conservatory of Music in Kimball Hall.

Among his students was Helen Searles Westbrook (1889–1967), who became an acclaimed organist and performed with the Chicago Symphony Orchestra and the Chicago Opera Company under Bruno Walter.

Dunham is listed in Herbert Westerby's reference work The Complete Organ Recitalist (1927) as a significant Chicago organist of his era.

== Compositions ==
Dunham composed works for both the concert hall and the synagogue. His New York Times obituary listed several compositions:

- "Morning Services for the Synagogue" (1908), dedicated to Rabbi Emil G. Hirsch
- "Marpessa"
- "Symphony Fantasy," a symphony in D minor
- "Suite Moods"
- "Silence"
- Setting of the Bar'chu for synagogue worship

His published organ works, issued by the Clayton F. Summy Company of Chicago, include:

- Romanza in D (1903)
- Pastorale (1904)
- Symphonic Fantasy for organ and orchestra (1909)
- Scherzo in G major (1932)
- The Quiet of the Forest (1932)

== Personal life ==
Dunham married Florence Adele Fairchild (born December 27, 1878) on June 1, 1904, in Chicago. They had three children: Arthur Jr. (1907–1979), Charles (born 1907), and Leonora (1911–1990). The family resided in Chicago's Hyde Park neighborhood at 5806 Harper Avenue during the 1920s and 1930s.

Dunham died on January 24, 1938, at St. Luke's Hospital in Chicago from a cerebral hemorrhage, at age 62. He was buried at Oak Woods Cemetery in Chicago on January 26, 1938. He was survived by his widow Florence, son Arthur Jr., daughter Leonora, and his sister Daisy (Mrs. T. S. Pemberton).

== Legacy ==
His work at Chicago Sinai Congregation and KAM Temple placed him at the center of Reform Jewish musical life in Chicago. His "Morning Services for the Synagogue" (1908) was an early contribution to American synagogue music, and his Bar'chu setting was performed as recently as 2023 at a commemorative service celebrating 175 years of Jewish community in Chicago.

His death in 1938 marked a generational transition in Chicago synagogue music: his vacancy at KAM Temple was filled by Max Janowski, who would become an important Jewish liturgical composers of the twentieth century.
