= American Conservatory of Music (Hammond, Indiana & Belize) =

Binational music school

Coordinates: 41.59991°N 87.51953°W

American Conservatory of Music Hammond, Indiana & Belize
- Former names: Friends of the Conservatory, Inc. (Illinois); Conservatory Partners LLC (Illinois)
- Type: Religious
- Established: 1992
- Affiliation: Orthodox Church of Belize
- Officer in charge: Otto T. Schulze
- President: Theodora Schulze
- Dean: Rev. Daniel J. Gorham
- Location: Hammond, Indiana; Santa Elena, Belize, Hammond, Indiana (Chicago area); Santa Elena, Belize
- Campus: Hammond; Santa Elena, Belize
- Website: www.americanconservatory.edu www.orthodoxchurch.bz
- Hammond, Indiana (Chicago metropolitan area); 931 600 0 252; 252 Wildwood Road; Hammond, Indiana 46324 Santa Elena, Belize; 501 824 2382 16; 16 Maxi Street; Santa Elena, Belize; CENTRAL AMERICA

The American Conservatory of Music, Inc., of Hammond, Indiana, is a binational music school that operates under the auspices of the Orthodox Church of Belize, which is part of the Greek Orthodox Metropolitanate of Central America, one of the 18 Archdioceses and Metropolitinates under the Patriarchate of Constantinople. The Conservatory was founded in 1992 with the intent to save, by becoming successor, a 105-year-old Chicago institution by the same name, American Conservatory of Music, which was shuttered in 1991 as a result of full liquidation under a Chapter 7 bankruptcy. The new institution was first located in Chicago—it took over the lease of the bankrupt Conservatory at 17 N. State Street, Stevens Building, but in 1998, moved to 4117 Wabash Avenue, Hammond, Indiana, 24 miles away. The building in Hammond was, from 1904 to 1940, the factory of the Straube Piano Company. Today, the institution is located at 252 Wildwood Road in Hammond and at 16 Maxi Street, Santa Elena, Belize.

== History ==
=== 1992–1998 entity in Chicago ===
The founding group—composed of alumni, friends, students, and former faculty—organized informally in 1991 to wage an effort to resume operations of the bankrupt institution. The effort was headed by Richard Allen Schulze (b. Oct 20, 1928; d. Aug 7, 2001, Hammond, Indiana) and wife, Theodora Schulze (née Economou; b. Sept 19, 1930; d. March 27, 2018).

The group formed an entity named "Friends of the Conservatory, Inc.", in Illinois and began to operate a school in the Chicago building that the American Conservatory had vacated. The new entity had some of the same faculty and continuing students. They represented the new entity as an uninterrupted continuation of the American Conservatory of Music.

However, the State of Illinois deemed the new entity—Friends of the Conservatory—a different entity, one that was operating under the assumed name, American Conservatory of Music. The State of Illinois prevailed in court (that the new entity was granting degrees that were unauthorized by the State). The State held that Friends of the Conservatory had no legal connection with the original institution and warned that offering degrees without licensing was a violation State statutes. Ultimately, an Illinois court, in 1997, prohibited individuals involved with Friends (who, in 1997, had also formed an Illinois entity named "Conservatory Partners LLC") from awarding degrees.

In 1998, the Illinois Board of Higher Education reasserted its opinion that "the American Conservatory of Music ceased to exist in 1991 as an entity legally constituted to grant degrees in the state of Illinois".

Loss of accreditation

- The Illinois State Board of Education defines specific standards required to teach at a K-12 public school in Illinois. Qualified Bachelor of Music Education (BME) degrees must meet those standards to be accredited by the State. At the time of liquidation in 1991, the BME program at the Conservatory was accredited by the State. Richard Schulze, while President of the new entity, did not apply for, or attempt to renew, State accreditation.
- The old Conservatory had been one of six institutions that founded the National Association of Schools of Music (NASM) in 1924 and, in 1928, became a charter member when memberships were first bestowed. NASM accreditation reviews occur on a 10-year cycle. The old conservatory, while in Chapter 11 Bankruptcy in 1988 under Dean E. Harvey Jewell, DMA, renewed its NASM accreditation for its existing programs leading to associate degrees, all the way through doctorates. Robert Thayer, PhD—then the dean of the college of musical arts at Bowling Green—led the evaluation team on behalf of NASM. Because the new entity claimed to be the successor of the bankrupt conservatory, it also claimed to have inherited its NASM credentials. The accreditation, however, expired (by default for inaction) on May 1, 1998.
- Following the NASM expiration, the U.S. Department of Education delisted the bankrupt Conservatory as an Accredited Post Secondary Institution.
- In turn, the Carnegie Foundation for the Advancement of Teaching delisted the bankrupt Conservatory from its Classification of Institutions of Higher Education.

Illinois bans use of the name, American Conservatory of Music

- In 1999, the State of Illinois prohibited the individuals associated with Friends from offering classes for credit or using the name "American Conservatory of Music."

=== 1998 move to Hammond, Indiana, and reincorporation as an Indiana entity ===
In 1998, the new entity gained a sponsor—the Orthodox Monastery of St. Michael the Archangel in Belize, and began operating from a new venue: St. Demetrios Greek Orthodox Church in Hammond, Indiana. The Indiana Commission on Proprietary Education exempts ACM programs from state oversight because it is a religious institution protected under the Indiana Constitution and the First Amendment of the United States Constitution. As an exempted religious institution, the State of Indiana neither grants nor prohibits ACM the right to offer educational programs leading to degrees of any type.

The Indiana entity was created on August 20, 1998, as a non-profit corporation under the name American Conservatory of Music, Inc. (former name was Hattstaedt Foundation of Music Incorporated), then located at 4117 Wabash Avenue, Hammond, Indiana—now located at 252 Wildwood Road in Hammond. Its Articles of Incorporation declare it to be a "religious corporation which is organized primarily or exclusively for religious purposes".

== Officers and directors ==
Current

- Otto T. Schulze (né Otto Theodore Schulze; born 1958), chairman, son of Theodora and the late Richard Allen Schulze (1928–2001)
- Theodora Schulze (née Economou; born 1930), president
- Rev. Daniel J. Gorham, director, Santa Elena, Belize
- Rev. Joseph T. Magnin, director, Santa Elena, Belize
- Benjamin A. Ubovich (born 1952), director, San Gabriel, California
- Samuel Rhee, DMA, director, Los Angeles, California
- John C. Longsworth, director, Santa Elena, Belize

Former

- Diane M. Vail, director
- Elizabeth B. Howard, non-voting corporate secretary
- Sally Cademcian, director
- Martha K. Gingles (born 1945), corporation secretary, Canton, Georgia

ACM reported net income of −$35,336; $224,787; $28,566; and −$7,488 US dollars for the tax years 2011, 2010, 2009, and 2008, respectively.

== Deans ==
- 1992–1993: Amelia C. Sligting, ACM DMA 1989 (1919–1994)

== Notable alumni ==
- Roy Cornelius Smith (DMA 2006), operatic tenor
