= Edward Joseph Collins =

American pianist and classical composer

Edward Joseph Collins (November 10, 1886 – December 1, 1951) was an American pianist, conductor and composer of classical music in a neoromantic style.

== Life and career ==
Collins was born in Joliet, Illinois, into an Irish family – his father was from County Meath and his mother from Belfast. From age 14, he studied with Rudolph Ganz in Chicago, and in 1906 went with Ganz to Berlin, where he studied performance and composition at the Berlin Hochschule für Musik under Max Bruch and Engelbert Humperdinck. Upon graduation, he had a successful concert piano debut in Berlin. He returned to the United States in 1912 and toured with the contralto Ernestine Schumann-Heink. He was an assistant conductor with the Century Opera Company in New York City and with the Bayreuth Festival in Germany.

During World War I, Collins served in the U.S. Army (88th Division of the Intelligence Unit in France) as an interpreter and entertained the troops as pianist. From Private he rose up to the rank of Lieutenant during the war.

After the war he returned to Chicago and joined 1919 the faculty of Chicago Musical College as one of the principal piano teachers. Collins married a voice student, Frieda Mayer, whose father, Oscar, owned a meatpacking company and was well to do. Collins and his wife had four children namely Dorothy Louise, Marianna Louise, Louise Joan and Edward Joseph junior. Having married into a family of wealth, they lived in the Mayer residence on Sheridan Road in Chicago.

He later joined the faculty of the American Conservatory of Music. He died in Chicago, Illinois in 1951.

== Music ==
Collins belonged to a group of conservative Chicago composers whose influence did not reach far beyond the city. His music includes twelve major orchestral works (incl. three piano concertos), a secular cantata, an opera, several chamber works, more than 20 songs and a dozen piano solo and duo scores. For a number of years he was preoccupied with his Irish heritage and wrote several long scores for large orchestra involving traditional Irish melodies.

== Family ==
While at Chicago Music College, Collins met and married, on July 21, 1920, a voice student, Frieda Johanna Mayer (November 17, 1889 Chicago, Illinois - December 7, 1965 Birmingham, Michigan), daughter of meat-packing magnate Oscar Mayer.

== Compositions ==
Stage

- Who Can Tell (operetta)
- Daughter of the South (1939), opera

Cantata

- Hymn to the Earth (1928) for solo voices, chorus and orchestra

Orchestral works

- 1914. Tragic Overture (1914; rev. 1926 and 1942)
- Piano Concerto No. 1 in E-flat major (premiered 1925)
- Symphony in B minor "Nos habeit humus" (1925)
- Irish Rhapsody (1927)
- Set of Four (1927)
- Hibernia (Irish Rhapsody, Variations on an old Irish Song) (1929)
- Concert Piece for Piano and Orchestra (Piano Concerto No. 2) (1931)
- Variations on an Irish Folksong (1931)
- Ballet Suite: The Mask of the Red Death (1932)
- Mardi Gras (1933)
- Valse elegante (1933)
- Lament and Jig (1941)
- Piano Concerto No. 3 in B minor (1942)
- Cowboy's Breakdown (1944)

Chamber music

- Piano Trio (Geronimo) op. 1
- Arabesque
- Cello Suite
- Prayer

Other

- More than a dozen piano solo and duo scores
- 15 songs for voice and piano

== Recordings ==
- Piano Compositions, performed by Mayne Miller (piano, on the orchestral work), Gunnar Johansen (piano solo works), Peninsula Music Festival Orchestra, Thor Johnson (cond.). Contains: Concert Piece for Piano and Orchestra in A minor; Cowboy's Breakdown; Tango (in Form of a Rondo); Valses caractéristiques, Op. 18; on: [private recording], LP (1980), OCLC 6665455.
- Music of Edward Joseph Collins Vol. 1, performed by Earl Wild (piano), Gunnar Johansen (piano), Manhattan String Quartette. Contains: Variations on an Irish Tune; All God's Chillun' Got Wings; Didn't My Lord Deliver Daniel?; Lil' David Play On Yo' Harp; The Gospel Train; Valses caractéristiques, Op. 18; Cowboy's Breakdown; Tango (in Form of a Rondo); Passacaglia; Allegro piacevole, from First String Quartet in D Minor; on: Albany Troy 1156, CD.
- Music of Edward Joseph Collins Vol. 2: Orchestral Music, performed by Leslie Stifelman (piano), Concordia Orchestra, Marin Alsop (cond.). Contains: Mardi Gras; Concert Piece in A minor for Piano & Orchestra; Tragic Overture; Valse elegante; on: Albany Troy 267, CD.
- Music of Edward Joseph Collins Vol. 3: Orchestral Music, performed by William Wolfram (piano), Royal Scottish National Orchestra, Marin Alsop (cond.). Contains: Piano Concerto No. 3 in B minor; Symphony in B minor; on: Albany Troy 625, CD.
- Music of Edward Joseph Collins Vol. 4: Orchestral Music, performed by William Wolfram (piano), Royal Scottish National Orchestra, Marin Alsop (cond.). Contains: Hibernia (Irish Rhapsody); Piano Concerto No. 1; Lil' David Play On Yo' Harp; Lament and Jig; on: Albany Troy 630, CD.
- Music of Edward Joseph Collins Vol. 5: Chamber Music and Songs, performed by Frank Almond (violin), Parry Karp (cello), Jeffrey Sykes (piano), Patrice Michaels (soprano), Elizabeth Buccheri (piano). Contains: Arabesque; Cello Suite; Prayer; The Daffodils; The Pines; The Wooded Lake; Death of the Leaves; Butterflies; Magdalene; To a Little Child; Prayer for C.H.S.; The Faded Violet; Music When Soft Voices Die; The Fog; The Bayadre; A Piper; Annabel Lee; Song and Suds; on: Albany Troy 641, CD.
- Music of Edward Joseph Collins Vol. 6, performed by Jeni Bern (soprano), Jane Irwin (mezzo), Peter Auty (tenor), Henry Waddington (bass), Royal Scottish National Orchestra & Chorus, Marin Alsop (cond.). Contains: Hymn to the Earth; Variations on an Irish Folksong; Cowboy's Breakdown; on: Albany Troy 650, CD.
- Music of Edward Joseph Collins Vol. 7: Orchestral Music, performed by Royal Scottish National Orchestra, Marin Alsop (cond.). Contains: Ballet-Suite: The Masque of the Red Death; Irish Rhapsody; Set of Four; on: Albany Troy 657, CD.
- Music of Edward Joseph Collins Vol. 8: Chamber Music and Songs, performed by Patrice Michaels (soprano), Anna Polonsky (piano); Sussmann/Albers/Polonsky Trio, Jeffrey Sykes (piano). Contains: Nocturne; Etude; Again the Year Has Come to the Spring; June Night; Piano Trio (Geronimo), Op. 1; Four Waltzes, Op. 15; Valses caractéristiques, Op. 18; Frédéric François; Joshua Fit de Battle ob Jerico; The 5:48; on: Albany Troy 1086, CD.
- Music of Edward Joseph Collins Vol. 9, performed by Peter Auty (tenor), Andrea Baker (mezzo-soprano), Lisa Milne (soprano), Keel Watson (bass-baritone), Roland Wood (baritone), Peter Coleman-Wright (baritone), Royal Scottish National Orchestra and Chorus, Marin Alsop (cond.). Contains: Daughter of the South (opera), on: Albany Troy 1210, CD.
- Music of Edward Joseph Collins Vol. 10: Chamber Music and Songs, performed by Arnaud Sussmann (violin), Patrice Michaels (soprano), Anna Polonsky (piano), William Browning (piano). Contains: Sonata, Op. 2/14; Arabesque; Variations on a Negro Theme; Variations on an Irish Theme; Canons; Six Technical Stunts in Canonic Form; Love is a Thing Divine; Clover Leaf Song; Valses caractéristiques, Op. 18; on: Albany Troy 1230, CD.
