= Wishart Bryan Bell =

American conductor

Wishart Bryan Bell (born in Canada, currently living in South Bend, Indiana) is an American choral conductor, pianist, music educator, and musicologist. In 1997, he joined the faculty at Bethel College, Mishawaka, Indiana. He retired in 2016.

== Founder of Musical Arts Indiana ==
Bell founded Vesper Chorale in 1993, Vesper Chamber Orchestra in 1999, and the Children's Choir of Michiana in 2004. In 2010 Vesper Chorale Inc. re-organized as Musical Arts Indiana Inc., creating a new parent organization. Based in South Bend, Musical Arts Indiana sponsors Vesper Chorale, Vesper Chamber Orchestra, Consortia, and the Children's Choir of Michiana. Bell served as artistic director of the organization and conductor from its inception until his retirement. He conducted his final concerts in May 2018.

== Selected discography ==
- "How excellent is Thy name," Fantasy Sound, Kitchener, Ontario (1977) OCLC 55972752

Emmanuel Chorale; Kenneth Smith, piano; Roger Charman, guitar; Wishart Bell, conductor

- "How Can I Keep From Singing?", recording of hymns commissioned by Fine Arts Radio Station WAUS and the Howard Performing Arts Center, Andrews University September, 2007
- "Lo How a Rose" traditional and modern carols for Christmas, 2001, with Vesper Chorale. Includes settings by Britten, Jacques, Willcocks and others
- "The Light of the World," unaccompanied sacred choral works, summer 2000. Includes works by Distler, Duruflé, Poulenc, Rains, Shaw/Parker
- "Holocaust Cantata: Songs from the Camps," DVD recorded and broadcast by Public Television Station WNIT, 2010

== Selected publications ==
- Mozart's Requiem: A Guide to Performing Musicians, published in the Journal of the Conductors’ Guild, 2007
- What is a Church Choir? Article on philosophy of church choral singing, published in The American Organist, the journal of the American Guild of Organists, November 2006
- Faith as Expressed Through the Arts. Essay calling the modern church to understand the vital role arts can play in worship, published in The American Organist, January 2007

== Education ==
- Trinity College, Deerfield, Illinois, 1971
- Master of Music, American Conservatory of Music, Chicago, 1974
- Doctor of Musical Arts, American Conservatory of Music, Chicago, 1997
