= Mae Doelling Schmidt =

American virtuoso pianist and composer

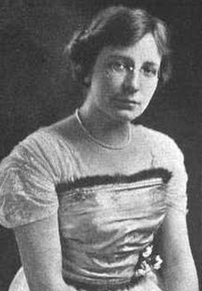
- Mae Doelling, from a 1922 publication.
- Born: Mary Metzke; 22 May 1888; Chicago
- Died: 11 March 1965 (aged 76); Chicago
- Other names: Mae Doelling, May Doelling
- Occupations: pianist, composer, music educator

Mae Doelling Schmidt (née Mary Metzke; 22 May 1888 Chicago – 11 March 1965 Chicago) was an American virtuoso pianist, composer, clubwoman, and music educator from Chicago. She was on the faculty of the American Conservatory of Music.

== Early life ==
Mae Doelling Schmidt, born Mary Metzke, was the youngest of four girls born to Julius (aka August) Metzke (surname also spelled Mätzke; 1847–1907) and Marie J. Schwechert (maiden; 1854–1892), both German immigrants from Prussia who married in Chicago on August 28, 1878. Mae's mother died when she was 4 years old.

=== Adoptee parents ===
Separated from her sisters when she was a toddler, Mae, when she was five, was adopted by German-born Chicagoans, Paul Wilhelm Doelling (1846-1909) (Note: The "oe" in "Doelling" is a digraph (pair of characters) that represent the Germanic pronunciation for the umlaut o, or ö. The German spelling of Doelling is Dölling, which sometimes, in English, is transcribed as Dolling.) and Ida B. Doelling (née Ida B. Wolff; 1852–1911) – who both immigrated to the United States in 1882. He was a cigar maker. Paul and Ida Doelling also adopted Paula Hoffman in 1891.

=== Formal education ===
At the age of 9 Doelling began studying in the Children's Department of the American Conservatory of Music, where at age 10 she earned a Silver Medal, and at age 12 a gold medal. At age 14, she entered the Royal Conservatory of Music at Dresden where she studied with Laura Rappoldi (née Laura Kahrer; 1853–1925), a former student of Liszt, Adolf von Henselt, and Hans von Bülow. Doelling earned a First Prize diploma there, at age 16. In the summer of 1918, Doelling participated in master classes held by Leopold Godowsky in Los Angeles.

In 1904, while studying in Berlin, Dölling competed and won a Mendelssohn Prize in piano (one of four winning pianists). The prize included a stipend of 200 Deutsche Marks (equivalent to about 1398 euros in 2021).

== Career ==
Mae Doelling played piano in concerts and recitals, notably as a soloist with the Chicago Symphony Orchestra, the Women's Symphony Orchestra of Chicago, and the Milwaukee Symphony. She was a member of the Zukovsky Trio, with Alexander Zukovsky (1880–1942) (violin) (Note: Alexander Harry Zukovsky (1880–1942) was concertmaster of the Chicago Symphony for 18 years. He made his American debut with the Cincinnati Orchestra November 29, 1909, performing the Tchaikovsky Violin Concerto, Leopold Stokowski conducting. The performance was also Stowkowski's American debut. ("Music Notes," Chicago Tribune, November 7, 1909, sec. 2, p. 4, col. 4; accessible via Newspapers.com)) and Theodore du Moulin (1888–1978) (cello). A 1922 report described Doelling as "forceful when necessary", but adding that "she relies on brains rather than physical strength to bring out the beauties of the music." She often included her own compositions in her programs. Her piano compositions included "Two Studies" (1922), "Venetienne" (1939), "Swiss Music Box" (1939), "Romance" (1939), "Tarantella for 2 solo pianos."

Mae Doelling Schmidt taught piano at the American Conservatory of Music. One of her piano students, Mae Willems (née Mary J. Willems; 1902–1967), who was blind, went on to become a celebrated pianist, singer, and music educator in Chicago. Doelling also gave presentations on the music of China and Latin America, to children and community groups. She was an officer in the Illinois Federation of Women's Clubs, and represented Chicago at a meeting of the National Federation of Music Clubs.

== Selected performances ==
At age 14 Doelling played before the last King of Saxony, Frederick Augustus III, at the Taschenbergpalais. She also performed for Princess Louise of Belgium and other royal audiences.

On November 29, 1934 Doelling performed the American premier of Max Trapp's Concerto for Pianoforte in D Major, Op. 26, with the Chicago Symphony in the Auditorium Theatre, Frederick Stock conducting.

Schmidt actually performed the concerto earlier, on March 3, 1934, for a private event hosted by plant pathologist Fred Reuel Jones, PhD (1884–1956), and wife, Edith Jones (née Edith Katharine Seymour; 1896–1984), at the College Club in Madison, Wisconsin, for 75 guests that included her sister, Mrs. Chester Barlow (née Louise Theadora Metzke; 1885–1976) – the second youngest of the four. The College Club at 12 East Gilman Street was the Madison branch of the American Association of University Women.

== Personal life ==
On July 4, 1922 Mae Doelling married musician Richard Walter Schmidt (1888–1945) in Chicago at her residence at Pine Lodge, 3616 Pine Grove Avenue in the Norwood Park neighborhood. She died March 11, 1965 – age 76 – at the Illinois Masonic Hospital in Chicago. She was buried four days later at Arcadia Park Cemetery, Near Norwood Park. She was a widow when she died.

== Extant compositions ==
=== Music ===
- "Romance"

Mae Doelling Schmidt (composer)
Clayton F. Summy Co. (publisher)
© 8 December 1939; EP81427 (Note: Vol. 35, Part 5, For the Year 1940, No. 1 (1940), p. 87)

Renewed 10 August 1967; R415302 (Note: Vol. 21, Part 5, July–December 1967, No. 2, Section I (1968), Addenda: p. 3)
Northern Trust Corporation (E)

OCLC 889221888, 838632195

- "Venetienne"

Mae Doelling Schmidt (composer)
Clayton F. Summy Co. (Note: Clayton Frick Summy (1852–1932), a native of Landisville, Pennsylvania, was a leading music publisher in Chicago.) (publisher)
© 8 December 1939; EP81428 (Note: Vol. 35, Part 5, For the Year 1940, No. 1 (1940), p. 109)

Renewed 10 August 1967; R415301 (Note: Vol. 21, Part 5, July–December 1967, No. 2, Section I (1968), p. 2392)
Northern Trust Corporation (E)

OCLC 838632195

- "Swiss Music Box"

Mae Doelling Schmidt (composer)
Clayton F. Summy Co. (publisher)
© 23 September 1940; EP87886 (Note: Vol. 35, Part 5, For the Year 1940, No. 9 (1940), p. 1327)

Renewed 11 December 1967; R424412 (Note: Vol. 21, Part 5, July–December 1967, No. 2, Section I (1968), p. 2383)
Northern Trust Corporation (E)

- "Native Hoosier"

aka "Hoosier, Who's Your Father?, Who's Your Mother, Hoooo Hoosier?"
Mae Doelling Schmidt (composer)
Grace Patterson López-Díaz (words) (Note: Grace Patterson López-Díaz (née Grace May Patterson; 1881–1956) was, from at least 1917 to at least 1948, a Spanish teacher, then, later, an art teacher, first at Crane Technical High School, then at Lane Technical College Prep High School, both in Chicago.)
Clayton F. Summy Co. (publisher)
© 2 October 1940; EP88143 (Note: Vol. 35, Part 5, For the Year 1940, No. 10 (1940), p. 1429)
OCLC 247789719

- "Tarantella," for 2 Solo pianos

Mae Doelling Schmidt (music)
OCLC 864902521

- "Exaltation"

Mae Doelling Schmidt (composer)
Josephine Hancock Logan (Note: Josephine Spring Hancock Logan (née Josephone Hancock; 1862–1943) was a poet and wife of Frank Granger Logan (1851–1937), the namesake and benefactor of the Logan Medal of the Arts. Josephone was also the founder of the Society for Sanity in Art) (words)
Carl Fischer, Inc. (publisher)
© 23 June 1944; EP123745 (Note: Vol. 39, Part 5, For the Year 1944, No. 9 (1944), p. 1153)

- "Make Way, Here Comes the U.S.A." (song)

Mae Doelling Schmidt (music)
© 14 January 1943; EU320670 (Note: Vol. 38, Part 5, For the Year 1943, No. 1 (1943), p. 47)

=== Dramatic works ===
- George and Sally Applecore's Adventures in Latin America

A dramatic composition with incidental music
Mae Doelling Schmidt
© 2 February 1948; DU12676 (Note: Vol. 2, January–June 1948, No. 1 (1948), p. 97)

- Ye Olde Reliable, Tired and True, We Won't Do You, Booking Agency

A skit with incidental music
Mae Doelling Schmidt
© 15 March 1948; DU13463

- The Enchanted Garden in Gnomerville

A narrative: rhymed story and music
Mae Doelling Schmidt
© 6 November 1953; C7468 (Note: Vol. 7, July–December 1953, No. 2 (1954), p. 145)

Copyright abbreviations:

EP = Class E (musical compositions, published in the United States)
EU = Class E (musical compositions, unpublished)
DU = Class D (dramatic and dramatical-musical works, unpublished in the United States)
C = Lectures and other works prepared for oral delivery
R = Copyright renewal
(E) = Executor of the author

== Copyrights ==
=== Original copyrights (music) ===
Catalog of Copyright Entries, Part 3, Musical Compositions, New Series, Library of Congress, Copyright Office

=== Original copyrights (drama and theater) ===
Catalog of Copyright Entries, Parts 3 & 4, Dramas and Works Prepared for Oral Delivery, New Series, Library of Congress, Copyright Office

=== Copyright renewals ===
Catalog of Copyright Entries, Part 3, Musical Compositions, Third Series, Library of Congress, Copyright Office
