= Acacia Park Cemetery, Norwood Park Township =

Cemetery in Cook County, Illinois

Acacia Park Cemetery
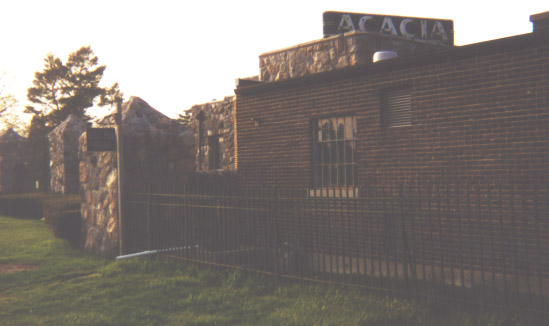
- The front gate, and office, of Acacia Park Cemetery
- Interactive map of Acacia Park Cemetery

Details
- Established: 1922
- Location: Norwood Park Township, Cook County, Illinois
- Country: United States
- Coordinates: 41.954°N 87.827°W
- Type: Masonic
- Find a Grave: Acacia Park Cemetery

Acacia Park Cemetery is located in Norwood Park Township, Cook County, Illinois, just outside Chicago. To its south, across Irving Park Road, is Irving Park Cemetery. On the north side, Acacia Park adjoins Westlawn Cemetery; the gates in the fence dividing Acacia Park and Westlawn are usually open, allowing visitors to pass freely between them.

== Notable burials ==
- Bobbie Aanstad (1901–1991), Eastland Disaster survivor.
- Johannes Anderson (1887–1950), World War I Medal of Honor recipient
- Ral Donner (1943–1984), singer
- Red Faber (1888–1976), baseball player
- Irna Phillips (1901–1973), television producer
- Alvah Curtis Roebuck (1864–1948), co-founder of Sears.
- Mike Royko (1932–1997), columnist
- Mae Doelling Schmidt (1888–1965), pianist, composer, music educator
