= Helen Searles Westbrook =

American musician

Helen Westbrook
- Born: Helen Searles; October 15, 1889
- Died: 1967 (aged 77–78)
- Occupations: Organist; Composer
- Organizations: Chicago Opera Company; Central Church in Chicago

Helen Searles Westbrook (October 15, 1889 – 1967) was an American composer and organist who appeared with Chicago Symphony.

== Life ==
Westbrook was born in Southbridge, Massachusetts. She began organ lessons at age eleven with her mother, who was also an organist. Westbrook then studied with Arthur Dunham, Frank van Dusen, Wilhelm Middleschutte and Adolf Weidig at the American Conservatory, where she received a gold medal, as well as a young American Artists award. She married James Westbrook.

Westbrook was a theatre organist in Chicago. She played promotional concerts for the Hammond Organ Studios. She played with the Chicago Opera Company under Bruno Walter, as an organ soloist with Chicago Symphony, and on a WGN radio program for CBS which used her compositions "Dusk at Friendship Lake" and "Retrospection" as the program's theme songs. She was the music director at Central Church in Chicago.

Westbrook was a member of the American Society of Composers, Authors, and Publishers (ASCAP) and the Chicago Club of Women Organists. She helped manage the club's "Florence B. Price Organ Composition Contest" in 1954.

Through Replica Records, Westbrook released at least one 33 rpm recording ("Helen's Holiday"), as well as three 45 rpm recordings with Cecil Roy and Betty Barrie: 1) Buddy's Butterfly 2) The Thistle/Buddy's Garden 3) Christmas Eve/Plasco Toys.

== Compositions ==
Westbrook's compositions include:

=== Organ ===
- Andante Religioso
- Chanson Triste
- Concert Piece in D
- Dusk at Friendship Lakeu (used as the theme song for a CBS radio program)
- Here Comes Santa Claus
- Intermezzo
- Laughing Sprites
- Lento
- Melodie
- Menuett in Olden Style
- On the Ontonagon River
- Pastorale Scherzo
- Poem for Autumn
- Retrospection, (used as the theme song for a CBS radio program).
- Waltz Circe

=== Vocal ===
- Alabaster
- Christ My Refuge (text by Mary Baker Eddy)
- Hindu Cradle Song
- If You Call Me
- Invincible (text by Sarojini Naidu)
- Magnificat (text by Helene Grossenbacher)
- March Beside Him, Lord
- Music I Heard With You (text by Conrad Aiken)
- Six Indian Songs
- Solace (text by Josephine Hancock Logan)
- Wedding Prayer (text by Curt A. Mundstock)
