= Adele Marcus =

American pianist (1906–1995)

Adele Marcus (February 22, 1906 – May 3, 1995) was an American pianist and instructor whose career was based at the Juilliard School in New York City.

== Life and career ==
Marcus was born in Kansas City, Missouri, the youngest of 13 children of a rabbi and his wife, who were of Russian descent. When the family moved to Los Angeles, Marcus and her sister Rosamund formed a piano duo, locally known as the Two Prodigies, and were the students of Desider Josef Vecsei and Alexis Kall. She later studied under Josef Lhévinne and Artur Schnabel in New York City. After winning the Walter W. Naumburg Foundation Award in 1928, she made a series of solo recital debuts in Chicago, San Francisco and New York City. Of her New York debut in 1929, The New York Times wrote: "Last night she displayed distinguished gifts both as a technician and an interpreter."

Marcus taught on the faculty of the Juilliard School in New York City from 1954 to 1990. She also gave master classes in piano performance at other conservatories, including the American Conservatory of Music in Chicago during the 1970s, in collaboration with William Browning, also a teacher of great repute.

Marcus's performances included a Carnegie Hall recital on January 25, 1949, in which she played Scarlatti, Brahms, Schubert, Schumann, Scriabin, Rachmaninoff, Stravinsky and Chopin.

Marcus died on May 3, 1995, at her home in Manhattan, aged 89. In 2008, the Juilliard School established the Adele Marcus Piano Scholarship in her honor.

== Personal life ==
In May 1940, Marcus married Frederick "Fritz" Kitzinger (1904–1947), a German-born pianist, conductor, and opera coach. They divorced in 1943. For the duration of their marriage, the couple lived in Dallas, Texas, where they taught music at the Hockaday School. Marcus returned to New York following her divorce.
