= Katherine Ruth Heyman =

American pianist and composer (1877–1944)

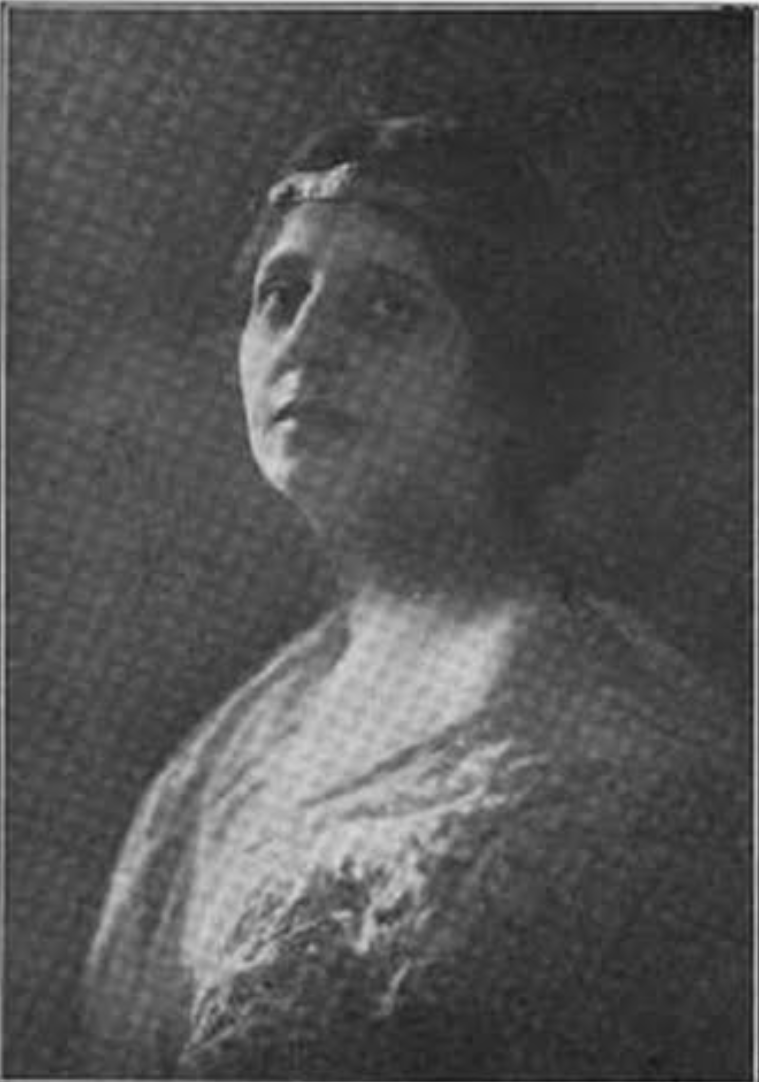
- Katherine Ruth Heyman in 1915
- Born: 1877; Sacramento, California, U.S.
- Died: September 28, 1944 (aged 66–67); New York City, U.S.
- Other names: Kitty
- Occupations: pianist; composer

Katherine Ruth Willoughby Heyman (1877 – September 28, 1944), nicknamed "Kitty", was an American pianist and composer. She was a proponent of the music of Alexander Scriabin, and she gave several recitals consisting solely of his music.

== Biography ==
=== Early life ===
Heyman was born in 1877, in Sacramento, California. Her father was violinist Arnold Heyman, a student of Louis Spohr.

She studied in Berlin from 1881 to 1894, including piano with Karl Heinrich Barth. She later studied in Vienna and later London before returning to the United States for further studies.

=== Career ===
Heyman made her professional debut as a soloist with the Boston Symphony Orchestra on October 13, 1899. In 1905, she moved to London and often toured European cities, especially in Russia. During this time, she toured together with singers Ernestine Schumann-Heink and Marcella Sembrich. She met Ezra Pound, who dedicated the 1906 poem "Scriptor ignotus" to her, during this time.

In addition to her performing activities, she also gave lectures about music. The Relation of Ultramodern to Archaic Music, a collection of her lectures was published in 1921 by Small, Maynard & Company.

She was a noted proponent of Scriabin, and gave several recitals in the 20s and 30s consisting entirely of his music in New York and Europe. She also held "conferences" at her Upper East Side loft where she performed Scriabin works, attendees including composers Charles Ives, Charles Tomlinson Griffes, and Elliott Carter.

=== Death ===
Heyman died on September 28, 1944, of a heart ailment, while en route from Sharon Hospital, where she had been staying for her last two months, to St. Luke's Hospital (now Mount Sinai Morningside).

== Bibliography ==
- The Relation of Ultramodern to Archaic Music. Boston: Small, Maynard & Company. 1921.

== Discography ==
- 1937, Scriabin: Piano Sonata No. 4, Op. 30, Friends of Recorded Music, F.R.M. DISC 7A/7B
- 1937, Schoenberg: 3 Piano Pieces, Op. 11, 2nd movement / Scriabin: 2 Dances, Op. 73, 2nd movement, Friends of Recorded Music, F.R.M. DISC 9A/9B
- 1938, Scriabin: Piano Sonata No. 4, Op. 30, Friends of Recorded Music, GM353/4
- 1940, Scriabin: Piano Sonata No. 5, Op. 53, Friends of Recorded Music, GM552/4
- 1940, Scriabin: 4 Preludes, Op. 37: No. 2 / 12 Etudes, Op. 8: No. 2, Friends of Recorded Music, GM641
- 1940, Scriabin: Piano Sonata No. 10, Op. 70, Friends of Recorded Music, GM355/7
