= John W. Peterson =

American songwriter (1921–2006)

John Willard Peterson (November 1, 1921 – September 20, 2006) was a songwriter who had a major influence on evangelical Christian music in the 1950s through the 1970s. He wrote over 1000 songs, and 35 cantatas.

== Early life and education ==
Born in Lindsborg, Kansas, the son of Peter and Mary Peterson, he served as an Army Air Force pilot flying the China Hump during World War II. Later, Peterson attended Moody Bible Institute and worked on the radio staff there at WMBI-FM for a number of years. In 1953, he graduated from the American Conservatory of Music in Chicago and shortly thereafter settled in Pennsylvania to continue his songwriting career.

== Career and ministry ==
Peterson later moved to Grand Rapids, Michigan, where for over ten years he was President and Editor-in-Chief of Singspiration, a sacred music publishing company (now part of Universal Music Group, except for the choral music publishing division, which following Universal's 2023 spinoff of printed choral music is now owned by Cooperative Baptist Fellowship affiliated Mercer University's Townsend School of Music and McAfee School of Theology). While there, he compiled and edited the hymnal, Great Hymns of the Faith (1961), which included 47 of his compositions out of a total of 548. He also served on the boards of Gospel Films, Inc. of Muskegon, Michigan and Grand Rapids School of Bible and Music.

In 1970 Peterson moved to Scottsdale, Arizona where he co-founded Good Life Productions and later started John W. Peterson Music Company.

Some of his more popular song titles include "It Took a Miracle" (1948), "Over the Sunset Mountains" (1953), "Heaven Came Down" (1961), "Springs of Living Water" (1950), "Surely Goodness and Mercy" (1958) and "O Glorious Love" (1970). His cantatas include Night of Miracles and Down From His Glory. He also composed the musical "Jesus is Coming", arranged by Don Wyrtzen.

== Honors and awards ==
He received the Sacred Music Award from the National Evangelical Film Foundation in 1967. In 1986, he was inducted into the Gospel Music Hall of Fame.

== Personal life and death ==
In 1944 Peterson married Marie Addis, and together they had three children. He died in Scottsdale, Arizona on September 20, 2006, aged 84, following a bout with prostate cancer.

== Publications ==
- Peterson, John W. (1953–1956). Miracle Melodies. Singspiration.
- Peterson, John W. (1958). John Peterson's Folio of Favorites. Singspiration.
- Peterson, John W. (1966). Singing Youth. Singspiration.
- Peterson, John W. (1968). Great Hymns of the Faith. Singspiration.
- Peterson, John W.; Enquist, Richard (1976). The Miracle Goes On. Zondervan.
