= Henry Sopkin =

American conductor (1903-1988)

Henry Sopkin (20 October 1903 New York – 1 March 1988 Palo Alto, California) was an American conductor. He founded, and for 21 years, from 1945 to 1966, led the Atlanta Symphony Orchestra. Before that, he had been a long-standing pedagogue at the American Conservatory of Music in Chicago, where he taught conducting and led the Conservatory Symphony Orchestra.

== Career highlights ==
Sopkin studied the violin as a youth and entered the American Conservatory of Music in Chicago, where he grew up, earning both bachelor's and master's degrees in music. In the 1920s and 1930s, he taught at the American Conservatory, at Chicago area high schools, and at Woodrow Wilson College before the Atlanta Music Club hired him in 1944. Under the patronage of the Atlanta Music Club, founded in 1915, the Atlanta Symphony emerged in 1947 from a successful Atlanta Youth Orchestra conducted by Sopkin. When he retired in 1966, the symphony became fully professional. His son, Charles Sopkin (1932–1994) was an author, editor and publisher.

Cultural offices
| Preceded by Sopkin was founder | Founding Music Director, Atlanta Symphony; 1945–1966 | Succeeded by Robert Shaw |
