= William Browning (pianist) =

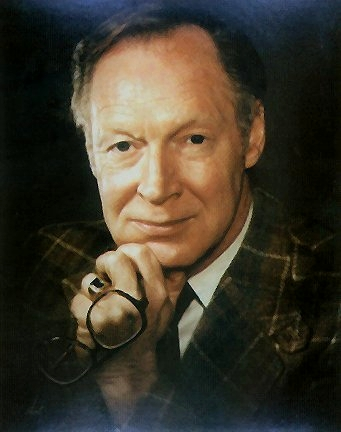
William Browning c. 1975

William James Browning (January 31, 1924 – November 9, 1997) was an American concert pianist, vocal coach and piano pedagogue.

== Early life ==
William Browning was born in Lawrence, Kansas into a musical family. His father was a concert singer who was friends with the esteemed pianist Carl Friedberg. Browning began playing at an early age, and had performed four Carnegie Hall recitals by the time he was 20 years old. He lived and studied in both the US and Europe.

His teachers included Carl Friedberg who studied with Clara Schumann and Johannes Brahms, and Will Humble, student of Leopold Godowsky who Browning said "was perhaps one of the greatest pianists in history, and was court pianist for Emperor Franz Josef." Later, Browning studied with Hans Levy Heniot, and Gui Mombaerts, who studied with Franz Liszt's student Arthur de Greef.

== Biography ==
Browning first came to Kansas State Teachers College of Pittsburg in 1941 and studied music. His musical career was interrupted during World War II and he spent three years in Army Special Services with General George Patton's 3rd Army Division.

Following army service, he completed his degree at Kansas State Teachers College of Pittsburg in 1947. He desired to study with conductor Hans Levy Heniot who was close to Godowsky and who had recently come to Chicago following several years as music director of the Utah Symphony Orchestra. At American Conservatory he earned a master's degree in Musical Performance. Following receipt of his master's degree, he continued to teach at the American Conservatory for 32 years. During this period he maintained close affiliation with Juilliard's Adele Marcus and many other prominent pedagogues.

Subsequent to his tenure at American Conservatory of Music, Browning was on faculty at Sherwood Conservatory and the Chicago Musical College of Roosevelt University. His studio was at the Fine Arts Building (Chicago).

== Performances and recordings ==
Throughout his career Browning soloed, performed with many symphonies and actively provided vocal accompaniment and coaching. As a recitalist, chamber music player and soloist with symphony orchestras, Browning performed extensively throughout North America, the UK, China and South Korea. During the 1960s he founded and led the Flancel Quartet, which premiered many American works. Under the auspices of Exxon, the National Music Council and the National Federation of Music Clubs, Browning premiered the William Ferris "Piano Sonata". This work had been commissioned for him and was premiered at the John F. Kennedy Center for the Performing Arts in Washington DC as part of the center's Bicentennial Parade of American Music.

Browning began live radio broadcasts working for WOAK FM Radio He was the official accompanist for WGN's Illinois Opera Guild Auditions of the Air, a vocal competition whose winners included many who went on to the Metropolitan Opera and recording careers. He also worked on other WGN projects including Essays in Music and for WFMT which was the successor to WGN on the FM Dial.

== Death ==
Browning died of a stroke on November 9, 1997 at Hinsdale Hospital at age 73.
