= John James Hattstaedt =

American music educator (1851–1931)

- John James Hattstaedt
- Born: December 29, 1851; Monroe, Michigan, US
- Died: November 30, 1931 (aged 79); Chicago, Illinois, US

John James Hattstaedt (pronounced HATT-stedt; b. 29 December 1851, Monroe, Michigan; d. 30 November 1931 Chicago) was a musician and teacher known as founder and president of the American Conservatory of Music, which he established in Chicago in 1886. It was the oldest private degree-granting school of music in the Midwest. He served as its president until becoming ill six months before his death. At that time, the Conservatory had an enrollment of over 3,000 students.

His widow Kate Hattstaedt took over the presidency, and then his son John Robert Hattstaedt took the position in 1935. The Conservatory finally closed in 1991, because of declining enrollment and rising costs.

== Early life and education ==
John James Hattstaedt was born in 1851 in Monroe, Michigan, the fourth of six children. His parents were both immigrants from Langenzeneur, Bavaria. His father, Georg Wilhelm Christoph Hattstaedt/Haddstadt, was a Lutheran pastor. His mother, the former Anne Marie Schmid, known as Mary Hattstadt in the United States, was 14 years younger than her husband. She died in 1861, when John was ten years old. The widower Wilhelm married again that year, to Louisa Baehr, also from Bavaria. They had a son together. The young John Hattstaedt studied music from an early age, becoming a pianist.

== Career ==
After his studies, Hallstaedt worked as a music teacher in Detroit, Michigan, and St. Louis, Missouri, where he specialized in piano. The latter city especially had a large population of German immigrants, who were eager for their children to study music. As an adult, he re-established the German spelling of his surname.

He moved to Chicago in 1875, which was booming as a city. It developed rapidly, based on being the center of numerous railroads that connected to resource and market centers, as a place for processing and export of natural resources, and a center of trade and industry in the Midwest.

In 1886, Hattstaedt founded the American Conservatory of Music, to develop a professional music school in the Midwest. He served as the founding president for more than four decades, and also taught as a music professor. During that time he led the development of the school and its faculty, attracting numerous artists. He led the development of the Conservatory Symphony Orchestra, and students gave regular recitals.

About six months before his death, Hattstaedt had to give up the presidency because of illness. When he died in 1931, the Conservatory had 3,000 students. His widow Kate Hallstaedt took over as president after her husband's death. She was succeeded in 1935 by their son, John Robert Hattstaedt, who served until his own death in 1978.

== Marriage and family ==
On 27 December 1882, Hattstadt married Kate (aka "Kitty"; née Kate May Castle). They had three children; two survived to adulthood: John Robert (1887-1978) and Louise Annie Hattstaedt (1889–1979), both born in Chicago. They both became involved in music, following their parents.

Kate deeply loved music. In the 72 years she lived in Chicago, she attended the opening of 62 seasons of the Chicago Symphony Orchestra. Late in life she moved to Hollywood, California, to live near their daughter Louise. She died there at the age of 106 on 7 August 1961.

John Robert Hallstaedt attended Princeton University from 1905 to 1907. In 1910 he was working as a salesman in advertising. In 1920 he worked as a music promoter and was still living in his parents' large household.

In 1930 he married Maren G. Johansen in 1930, who was a soprano and voice teacher. They had two children together. He later married Ethel Lyon Beck (1898-1994) in 1956, also in Chicago. She was a music teacher. He succeeded his mother Kate Hallstaedt as president of the American Conservatory of Music in 1935 and served until his death in 1978. He was survived by grandchildren.

Louise Hallstaedt became a professional soprano singer. She married Hugh Comer Winter (1892–1963). In 1920 he was working as a salesman in advertising. They had a daughter Dorothy L. Winter, and lived in Louise's parents' large household. Later in life Louise Winter worked as a television director in southern California, and her widowed mother moved from Chicago to live nearby in Hollywood.
