= Roy Cornelius Smith =

American opera singer

Roy Cornelius Smith is an American operatic tenor, from Big Stone Gap, Virginia.

Smith has performed leading tenor roles at many opera houses and festivals including the Salzburg Festival, Spoleto Festival, Metropolitan Opera, Vienna Volksoper, Deutsche Oper Berlin, New York City Opera, and Lyric Opera of Chicago. He has also performed as a soloist with the Chicago Symphony Orchestra, New York Philharmonic, Orchestra del Teatro Carlo Felice, Orchestre Métropolitain du Grand Montréal and with the Vienna Radio Symphony Orchestra.

In the summer of 2011 Smith made his Bregenzer Festspiele debut, performing the title role in Andrea Chénier. Opera News stated "Roy Cornelius Smith has crossed into the dramatic repertoire, his voice darkening and gaining power, but without loss of its inherent sweetness and trumpet-like metallic top. Creating a vivid, charismatic character, Smith excelled in the role's two big arias, particularly an impassioned ringing 'Improviso'".

His 2012/13 season included new productions of La fanciulla del West and Don Carlo (role debut) at the National Theatre Mannheim, where he will also be heard as Otello, Calaf, Riccardo in Verdi's Un ballo in maschera, and as Cavaradossi in Puccini's Tosca, and debuts at the Norwegian National Opera as Canio. Last season also included his first Dick Johnson in La fanciulla del West with Lyric Opera of Chicago opposite Deborah Voigt, conducted by Sir Andrew Davis. Claudio Vellutini of Mundoclasico.com stated "American tenor Roy Cornelius Smith took over the demanding role of Dick Johnson. He showed remarkable command of the technical challenges of his part and his top register sounded particularly bold and sonorous...At the end of the evening, the audience rewarded him with a standing ovation."

Smith also debuted with the Royal Danish Opera in Copenhagen where he sang Turiddu in Cavalleria rusticana, directed by Kasper Holten and Canio in Pagliacci, directed by Paul Curran under the baton of Stefano Ranzani. He also performed Calaf in Turandot with New Orleans Opera opposite Lise Lindstrom and Deutsche Oper in Berlin opposite Maria Guleghina, and Dick Johnson in La fanciulla del West with Nashville Opera. Recent performances include Deutsche Oper Berlin as Calaf in Turandot, New York City Opera as Haman in Esther, the title role in Andrea Chénier with Nashville Opera, Radames in Aida with Opera Birmingham, Erik in Der fliegende Holländer with New Orleans Opera, and Pollione in Norma at the Chautauqua Institution. Other highlights include Calaf in Berlin, Vienna, Birmingham, North Carolina, Jacksonville and Memphis; Des Grieux (Manon Lescaut) in New Orleans; Erik (Der fliegende Holländer) in Grand Rapids; Pinkerton at the Steyr Music Festival in Austria and at the Aspen Music Festival; Canio in Pagliacci in Toledo; and Hoffegut in Braunfels' rarity, Die Vögel, at the Teatro Lirico di Cagliari and the Spoleto Festival, USA, under the baton of Julius Rudel. His highly successful debut as Pinkerton in Madama Butterfly with the Vienna Volksoper led to an invitation to sing Calaf in a new Barbe/Doucet production of Turandot for which he received rave reviews. Musical America exclaimed "his voice is huge, dusky and Italianate, his phrasing and use of dynamics generous and elegant, his stage presence endearing. 'Nessun dorma', sung sweetly, passionately and thrillingly, stopping the show cold (there is no cadence to the aria in the original score, but the explosive ovation and accompanying 'Bravos!' were so deafening and prolonged, Hager had no choice but to put down the baton)." His international debut occurred in 1998 at the prestigious Salzburger Festspiele, where he sang Fatty, the Bookkeeper, in Kurt Weill's Aufstieg und Fall der Stadt Mahagonny. (Available on Kultur DVD/Video with Catherine Malfitano and Dame Gwyneth Jones, conducted by Dennis Russell Davies). Later that same season he reprised the role in English for the Lyric Opera of Chicago.

Smith has a Doctor of Musical Arts degree from the American Conservatory of Music in Hammond, Indiana (2006), and Bachelor of Arts (1988) and Master of Arts (1990) degrees from the University of Tennessee.

== Awards and honors ==
- 1990 winner of the Metropolitan Opera National Council Auditions
- 1997 Licia Albanese/Puccini International Voice Competition
- 1999 MacAllister Awards including the "Audience Favorite Award"
- The Houston Grand Opera Young Artist Award

== Sources ==
- Metropolitan Opera, Smith, Roy Cornelius (Tenor), performance record on the MetOpera Database
- Oestreich, James R., A Don Giovanni Close to the Edge, Like Everyone Else, The New York Times, 7 June 2005
- Silverman, Mike, New York City Opera Revives Esther and Itself, ABC News/Associated Press, 8 November 2009
- von Rhein, John, Elektra electrifies – First nighters cheer splendor of Lyric cast, Chicago Tribune, 1 October 1992, p. 28 (subscription access)
