= Bobbie Aanstad =

Eastland Disaster Survivor

- Born: Borghild Amelia Aanstad; 28 July 1901; Trondheim, Norway
- Died: 2 August 1991 (aged 90); Chicago, Illinois, United States
- Burial place: Acacia Park Cemetery
- Known for: Surviving the SS Eastland disaster of 1915
- Spouse: Leonard Decker (1922-1965) Ernie Carlson (1976-1983)
- Children: 1

Borghild Amelia "Bobbie" Aanstad (28 July 1901 – 2 August 1991) was a Norwegian American woman who was among the last survivors of the 1915 SS Eastland ship disaster in Chicago. Only thirteen at the time of the disaster, she and her family were trapped within the ship following its capsizing for hours until rescue. Her descendants would go on to found the Eastland Disaster Historical Society.

== Early life ==
Bobbie Aanstad was born on 28 July 1901 in Trondheim, Norway, the daughter of Marianne Clausen and Akim Aanstad. As a child, she was described as sickly with respiratory issues. Despite doctors' pleas, the Aanstad family moved to America; she narrowly survived the trip. After moving to Chicago, Akim Aanstad worked tirelessly as a tailor to provide for his family which now included a second daughter, Solveig. One of Bobbie's most cherished memories was being taught to swim by a local friend named Ernie Carlson during a trip to Michigan, a skill that likely saved her life.

Bobbie came down with diphtheria in 1911 and once again barely survived. Akim contracted pneumonia around the same time due to sleeping at work and died. Marianne had to work as a cleaning woman to make ends meet, forcing Bobbie to be in charge of cleaning the house and taking care of her younger sister. To help the family, Marianne's brother Olaf Ness moved from Norway and worked for Western Electric at the Hawthorne Works facility in nearby Cicero. It is this connection that led the Aanstad family to attend the annual company picnic in 1915.

== Eastland Disaster ==
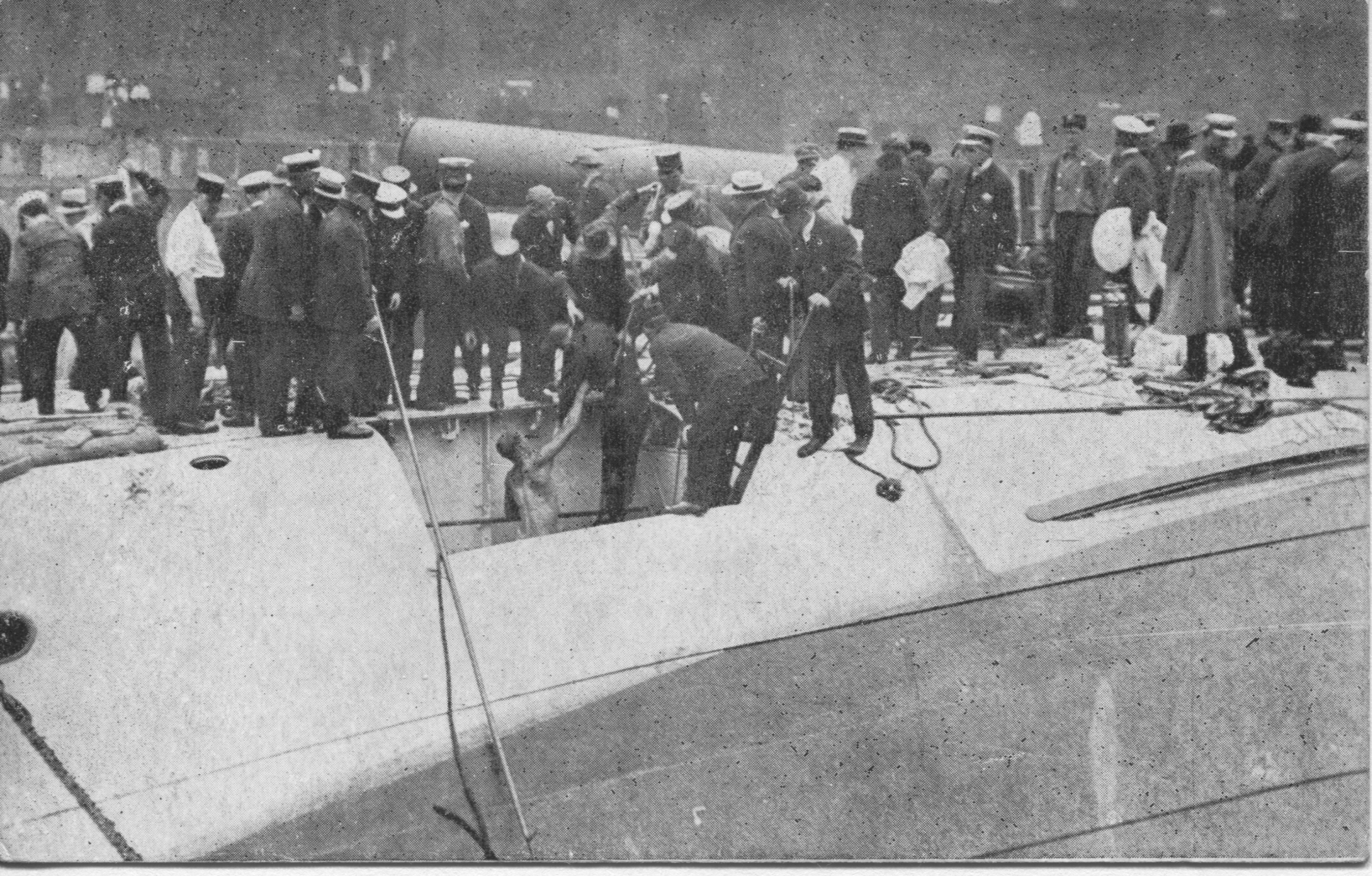
Survivor being lifted from Eastland's hull.

On the morning of 24 July 1915, the Aanstad family left their Chicago flat to board the steamer SS Eastland in the Chicago River. Around 7:00 AM, the family was aboard the large vessel, eagerly awaiting the ship to reach Michigan City, Indiana. As passengers boarded, the ship would sway from side to side; Marianne Aanstad repeatedly said to her brother during the swaying, "I don't like the feel of this boat."

The family had to move from deck to deck looking for a space to sit, finding a spot on the tween deck in the dead center of the ship. As the rolling worsened, few panicked at first, many thinking that it was normal or even fun. Eventually, when dishes began hitting the floor and water crept into the ship, it became clear something was wrong and full panic began.

When the ship's final plunge started, Bobbie held onto her family; she recalls, "People were falling in the water all around us." Eventually Bobbie was thrown from her chair into a pile of panicking, wailing passengers, and she nearly passed out. When Eastland completed its final roll into the river, the compartment the Aanstad family was trapped in began to fill with water, but remarkably did not fill all the way. For hours, Bobbie would recall people banging on the walls crying for help, and rescuers attempting to get into the ship. She dog paddled to stay afloat, hour after hour. How long she and her family were stuck in Eastland's hull is unclear. Eventually, welders began cutting open holes in the ship to rescue survivors. Someone saw survivors through a small porthole and were able to throw in a rope and rescue Bobbie.

Remarkably, the rest of the Aanstad family survived the disaster, with Olaf Ness even rescuing twenty seven survivors. They were one of the few families not to lose anyone in the disaster, although Solveig was briefly separated from her family in the chaos of the rescue operation. Ultimately, 844 lives were lost in the Eastland Disaster.

== Later life ==
The Aanstad family remained in Chicago for years after the disaster. Some were rewarded like Olaf Ness with a Cook County Coroners Star for bravery by Cook County Coroner Peter M. Hoffman, others, like Marianne and Solveig, rarely talked about the disaster. Ness eventually got married in the 1920s and left for California. Marianne also remarried that decade, remaining in Chicago as a humble worker. Like the rest of the family, Bobbie was traumatized by the disaster, but she didn't let it get in the way of her life. Years later Bobbie would openly talk about the disaster with family, friends, and later her first husband Leonard Decker Sr. She got a job as a switchboard operator and worked for many years, having one son, Leonard Jr. Leonard Decker Sr died suddenly of heart failure in 1965, leaving her with Leonard Jr and two granddaughters, Susan and Barbara.

Olaf Ness died in 1963 in California, Marianne died in 1966. The Aanstad sisters remained close through the decades. In the mid 1970s while on a trip to Arizona, Bobbie by chance met her old childhood friend Ernie Carlson, the man whose teachings saved her life. They were soon happily married until Carlson's death in 1983. Sister Solveig died in 1989. By the late 1980s, interest in the Eastland disaster had led to a plaque being installed near the spot on the Chicago River where the ship rolled over, but Bobbie was unable to attend the dedication ceremony due to health issues. She did, however, do an interview for a local Chicago news station that year. Bobbie Aanstad died peacefully on 2 August 1991, at the age of 90. At the time of her death, only two dozen Eastland survivors were left. The last survivor, Marion Eichholz, died on 24 November 2014 at the age of 102.

Susan Decker and Barbara Decker Wachholz, alongside Barbara's husband Ted, would found the Eastland Disaster Historical Society in 1998 in Bobbie's memory.

== In popular culture ==
- Bobbie Aanstad is one of the main characters in the play "Eastland: A New Musical" performed at the Lookingglass Theater in Chicago.
- In honor of the 100th anniversary of the Eastland Disaster, the Chicago Tribune created a comic depicting the Aanstad family in 2015.
- Bobbie Aanstad appears in the 2019 documentary, "Eastland: Chicago's Deadliest Day."
