= Helena Stone Torgerson =

American harpist and composer

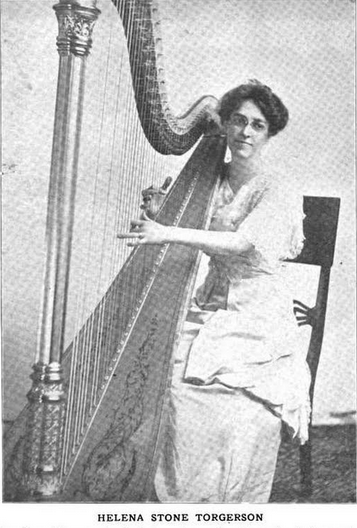
- Helena Stone Torgerson, from a 1918 publication
- Born: Helena Stone; 1878; Grand Rapids, Michigan
- Died: September 9, 1941 (aged 63); Rapid City, South Dakota
- Occupations: Harpist, composer
- Years active: 1896–1941

Helena Stone Torgerson (1878 – September 9, 1941) was an American harpist and composer of harp music, based in Chicago.

== Early life ==
Helena Stone was born in Grand Rapids, Michigan, the daughter of Frank A. Stone and India E. Colestock Stone. Her father was a manufacturer.

== Career ==
Helena Stone played harp at public events from her teenaged years. In 1899 she replaced Edmund Schuecker as harpist of the Bruno Steindel Concert Company. She was listed among the best-known women harpists in the United States in 1908, and in 1926 Torgerson was described as "Chicago's best woman harpist."

Torgerson performed as a solo harpist and in ensemble, and sometimes played her own compositions. She also gave talks about harp music and the history of the instrument. She had a custom-made concert harp, "built on larger scale than is commonly used", for "bigness and resonance of the tone". "Mrs. Torgerson plays the harp in an altogether superior way," commented one writer in 1913, adding that "besides possessing transcendent technic for the instrument, she is a thorough musician and has abundant good taste in interpretation."

Torgerson also taught harp and composed harp music. She studied composition with Adolf Weidig in Chicago. She dedicated her composition "The Squirrel" (1915) to "my little son". Torgerson published Harp Music, a collection of harp pieces organized for teaching purposes.

== Personal life ==
Helena Stone Torgerson married Lloyd R. Torgerson and had a son, Frank Stone Torgerson. She died from a stroke in 1941, aged 63 years, in Rapid City, South Dakota, while touring.
