= Marie Sidenius Zendt =

American singer (1882–1968)

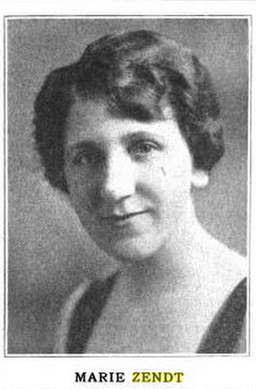
Marie Sidenius Zendt, from a 1920 publication.

Marie Sidenius Zendt (1882 – June 5, 1968) was a Swedish-born American soprano, based in Chicago, Illinois.

== Early life ==
Marie Hedvig Sidenius was born in Vislanda, Småland, Sweden, the daughter of D. Godard Sidenius and Betty Pauline Ibsen Sidenius. Her mother's family were Danish. Her father was an inspector at a saw mill in Sweden. She moved to Elgin, Illinois with her parents when she was a small child.

== Career ==
Zendt maintained a year-round busy touring schedule of concerts and recitals, focused in the American midwest, but with performances in New York City, Philadelphia, and Washington D. C. as well. In 1920, she toured Alaska giving concerts. A reviewer in 1922 described her as "among the Chicago singers who are doing big things." In 1932, she toured in Scandinavia. In 1935, she was the soloist at the United Swedish Singers' celebration of the 125th anniversary of the birth of Jenny Lind.

She was on faculty at the American Conservatory of Music in Chicago. She also performed live concerts on radio. In 1963, there was a luncheon at the Chicagoland Music Festival honoring Marie Sidenius Zendt for more than fifty years of active participation in the arts in Chicago.

== Personal life ==
Marie Sidenius married businessman George Zendt in 1901. They were still married 67 years later when Marie Sidenius Zendt died in 1968, aged 86 years.
