= Monte Hill Davis =

American classical pianist

Monte Hill Davis (May 24, 1932 – June 2, 2018) was an American classical pianist.

== Concert career ==
Davis toured and performed in Europe, Brazil, Peru, Balzano, Italy (the Busoni), Geneva, Switzerland, and Munich, Germany. Davis won first prize in the International Piano Competition in Munich in 1955. She won second place in the 1953 Ferruccio Busoni International Piano Competition. Davis also performed with the Dallas Symphony Orchestra, the Dallas Pops Orchestra directed by Arthur Fiedler, the National Symphony Orchestra under the direction of Howard Mitchell, and the Boston Pops.

=== Selected awards ===
- 1949 — Gold Medal, G. B. Dealey Memorial Award, Dallas (co-winner with Mary Nan Hudgins)
- October 1952 – Silver Medal, Geneva International Music Competition, Switzerland

== Teaching career ==
Davis began teaching piano at Southern Methodist University in 1962.

== Education ==
Davis began studying piano when she was five years old. She appeared with the Houston Symphony Orchestra, playing Mozart's Piano Concerto in D major, when she was nine years old. Three years later, on the recommendation of Ernst Hoffmann, she was sent to Denton, Texas, to study with Isabel and Silvio Scionti. She stayed in Denton through high school and went on to the University of North Texas where in 1952 she earned a Bachelor of Music in piano and in 1957 she earned a Master of Music in piano. In 1963, Davis studied piano with Ilona Kabos in London.

== Personal life and family ==
In 1953, Davis returned from Europe to America to marry Jack David Alexander who, in 1962, was among the 45 crew and passengers killed in a Continental Airlines Flight 11 crash near Centerville, Iowa. It was the first known case of sabotage aboard a commercial jet airliner. Jack was a former saxophonist and advertising entrepreneur. He had studied one semester (fall 1950) at the University of North Texas during which time he had playing in Lab Band directed by Gene Hall. Because of the Korean War, Alexander left school to join the U.S. Army Special Service — a 3-year tour. In 1955, he was an account executive at PAMS. In 1960, Alexander earned a Bachelor of Arts degree from Southern Methodist University. He had also been a partner at Futuresonic Productions Inc., a producer of jingles.

Monte and Jack had two daughters: Monte Ann and Katherine Lee. Davis died in Dallas on June 2, 2018.
