= Jim Bob Floyd =

American classical and jazz pianist, and educator (1929–2026)

- Born: James Robert Floyd; June 2, 1929; Tyler, Texas, U.S.
- Died: April 26, 2026 (aged 96); Portland, Oregon, U.S.

- Avocation: Concert pianist Collegiate music educator
- Idiom: Classical; Avant-garde; Experimental
- Academic Positions: Chairman of Keyboard Performance University of Miami, Frost School of Music (1981–2013) Chairman of Keyboard Performance Northern Illinois University (1962–1981) Head of the Piano Department Sam Houston State University (c. 1962) Chairman of the Fine Arts Division University of Corpus Christi (mid 1950s) Piano Instructor University of Kentucky (1949) University of North Texas (1948)
- Website: www.jbfloyd.com

Jim Bob Floyd (né James Robert Floyd; June 2, 1929 – April 26, 2026), also known as JB Floyd, was an American concert pianist (jazz, classical, experimental, avant-garde, and the like), composer and music pedagogue at the collegiate level. Before retiring in 2013, Floyd spent 64 years as a music educator in higher education, including as chairman of keyboard performance at Northern Illinois University from 1962 to 1981 and chairman of keyboard performance at the University of Miami's Frost School of Music from 1982 to 2013. Floyd was a Yamaha artist.

== Early life and education ==
James Robert Floyd was born in Tyler, Texas on June 2, 1929. He earned a Bachelor of Music in 1948 and a Master of Music in 1950 from the University of North Texas (College of Music). While at North Texas, he studied piano with Isabel and Silvio Scionti. In the 1950s, at the University of Corpus Christi, Floyd became head of the Department of Music, then Chairman of the Fine Arts Division. In Fall 1949, Floyd joined the music faculty of the University of Kentucky as piano instructor. He also served on the music faculty of Sam Houston State University.

== Career ==
Floyd, in 1949, was a grand winner of the National Guild of Piano Teachers Young Artist Competition at Town Hall in New York City. The award led to a sponsored solo recital at Town Hall, Wednesday, 8:30 pm, April 9, 1952. Harold C. Schonberg (1915–2003), a music critic for The New York Times, reviewed the performance. Floyd went on to earn a DMA in 1961 from Indiana University's Jacobs School of Music.

In 1962, Floyd joined the music faculty at the University of Northern Illinois. In 1981, Floyd joined the faculty at the University of Miami. He taught there for 32 years, retiring as Chair Emeritus in 2013 while serving as Chair of the University of Miami's Department of Keyboard Performance.

== Death ==
Floyd died in Portland, Oregon on April 26, 2026, at the age of 96.

== Selected discography ==
- JB Floyd Trio at the Catacombs (jazz). JB Floyd (piano); Fred Atwood (bass); Dave Merrifield (drums); Tony Calzaretta, vocalist. Claremont Records (1966). Claremont Jazz Series CLP–666, Castle Productions, Lake Geneva, Wisconsin.
- Suitable for Framing. David Rosenboom, JB Floyd, and Trichy Sankaran, A.R.C. Records (1975). OCLC 979580623 (all editions).
- Vol. 18, CDCM Computer Music Series, The Composer in the Computer Age–III. Centaur Records (1994). OCLC 31869526 (all editions). (Note: CDCM is an acronym for the Consortium to Distribute Computer Music).
- Vol. 19, CDCM Computer Music Series, The Composer in the Computer Age-IV: A Larry Austin Retrospective, Centaur Records (1995). OCLC 778855783 (all editions).
- Salvatore Martirano: "O, O, O, O, That Shakespeherian Rag. New World Records (1996). OCLC 162136581 (all editions).
- A Transporting Transmittance (CD), Mutable Music, label of Thomas Buckner (May 2003); OCLC 166266796 (all editions).
- In Crossing The Busy Street (CD), Mutable Music (2009); OCLC 457181264.
- Another Time And Place (CD), Mutable Music (2011); OCLC 773026916 (all editions).

== Selected publications ==
- "Beethoven's Piano Sonata, Op. 111 In Its Historical Perspective" (Master of Music thesis), by James Robert Floyd, University of North Texas, College of Music (1950); OCLC 40814324
- "The keyboard music of Pergolesi" (Giovanni Battista Pergolesi) (DMA dissertation), by James Robert Floyd, Indiana University Bloomington, Jacobs School of Music (1961); OCLC 30933844

== Bibliography ==
=== References ===
- "Classical Pianists – JB Floyd – Biography". Buena Park, California: Yamaha Corporation of America. Piano Division. n.d.
- Commencement, North Texas (August 25, 1950). "James Robert Floyd". Summer Commencement of North Texas State College (program). Denton: University of North Texas. p. 17 – via University of North Texas Libraries, Digital Library.
- The Corpus Christi Times; Bynum, Kay (January 2, 1952). "Robert Floyd Is Ready for His Big Recital". Vol. 42, no. 155. p. B1 – via Newspapers.com. (article provides early biographical information). ISSN 0894-5365. LCCN sn84006195. OCLC 10863206.
- Couture, François (2003). Transporting Transmittance: Music of J.B. Floyd (album review). AllMusic.
- Denton Record-Chronicle (April 27, 1952). "N.Y. Newspapers Hail Floyd Debut". Vol. 49, no. 212. p. 2 – via Newspapers.com. "Floyd studied with Isabel and Silvio Scionti ..."
- J.B. Floyd Trio (1966). At the Catacombs (LP vinyl record). Lake Geneva, Wisconsin: Castle Productions. Claremont Records. Claremont Jazz Series – CLP–666 – via Discogs release no. 10524085. J.B. Floyd (piano); Fred Atwood (né Fred Connell Atwood; born 1937) (bass); Dave Merrifield (né David Kay Merrifield; born 1937) (drums); Tony Calzaretta (né Anthony John Calzaretta; born 1940), vocalist (Claremont was a label of Vernon Charles Castle; 1928–2008).
- National Guild [of Piano Teachers] Page (September–October 1962). "Robert Floyd to Give Town Hall Recital". American Music Teacher (front matter). 12 (1). Music Teachers National Association: 44. ISSN 0003-0112. JSTOR 43536575. OCLC 494567442..
- "Pianist, Composer and Educator JB Floyd Retires From Frost School of Music". University of Miami, Frost School of Music, Media, Frost News. June 5, 2013. Archived from the original on June 20, 2017. Originally retrieved October 3, 2017
- "Renaissance Man: JB Floyd". Buena Park, California: Yamaha Corporation of America. Piano Division. August 8, 2003.
- Schonberg, Harold Charles (April 10, 1952). "Robert Floyd Gives First Recital Here". Amusements. The New York Times (review). Vol. 101, whole no. 34410. p. L37 (column 3 of 8, top) – via TimesMachine.
- "Teachers Go to Work". Music Educators Journal. 45 (4). National Association for Music Education: 12. February–March 1959. JSTOR 3389055. ISSN 0027-4321 (print). ISSN 1945-0087 (web). LCCN 2006-236975. OCLC 1639434 (all editions).
- Texas Birth Certificate – "James Robert Floyd" – "Amendment to Certificate of Birth". "Texas Birth Index, 1903–1997". Searching James Robert Floyd → DOB: June 2, 1929 → Place of birth: Tyler, Smith County (database with images). Austin: Texas Department of State Health Services – via FamilySearch. Reference ID: 51919; GS film no. 2240970; digital folder no. 4688276; image no. 285 (of 3534); indexing project (batch) no. C06136-3.
