= Florence White Williams =

Painter and illustrator

- Born: 1895; Putney, Vermont, U.S.
- Died: 1953 (aged 57–58)
- Education: Chicago Academy of Fine Arts
- Known for: Illustration

Florence White Williams (1895–1953) primarily worked as an artist and illustrator whose work included illustrated editions of The Little Red Hen, The Story of Little Black Sambo, and Granny's Wonderful Chair.

Born in Putney, Vermont, she attended the Chicago Academy of Fine Arts, now known as the School of the Art Institute of Chicago. Williams illustrated classic children's stories, as well as magazines like Child Life, the Christian Science Monitor, Little Folks, and St. Nicholas Magazine. She also collaborated with music educator Louise Robyn to produce piano pedagogy materials. Her artwork has been exhibited at the Detroit Institute of Art, Corcoran Gallery in Washington, DC, and the Milwaukee Art Institute.

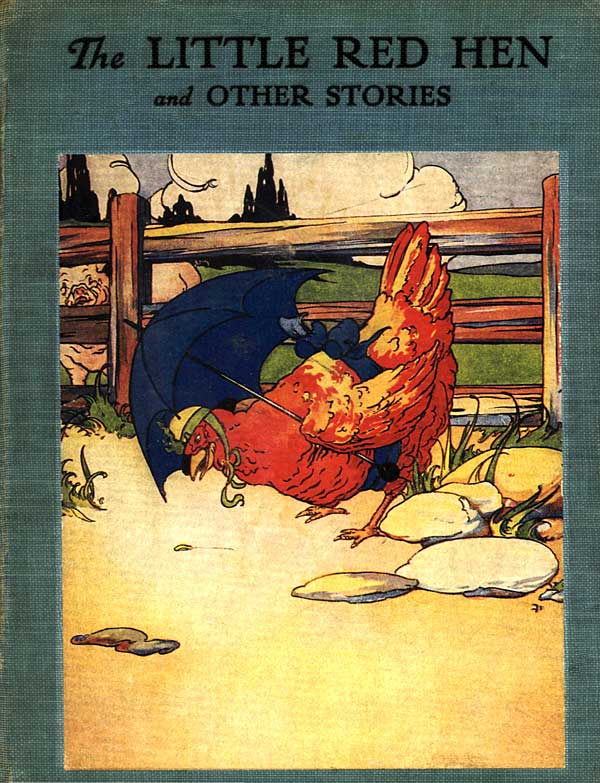
William's cover for the children's story "The Little Red Hen"

Williams' main mediums of choice were illustration, oil painting, and watercolor painting. Her work was showcased in numerous exhibitions: Chicago Galleries Association, 1927; Solo, Chicago Galleries Association, 1928; International Water Color Exhibition, AIC, 1924, 26; Annual Exhibition of Works by Chicago and Vicinity Artists, AIC, 1924-35 (7 times); All-Illinois Society of Fine Arts, Chicago, 1932; Century of Progress Exhibition by Artists of Illinois, Stevens Hotel, Chicago, 1933; Watercolor Exhibition, Baltimore(MD) Museum, 1930; Detroit (MI) Institute of Art; Milwaukee (WI) Art Institute; Art Students League of Chicago, 1924; Corcoran Gallery, Washington, DC.

Williams won 8 awards for her art: South Side Art League, Chicago; First Place, Art Students League of Chicago, 1924; Prize, Chicago Galleries Association, 1927; Hall Prize, 1927; Silver Medal, All-Illinois Society of Fine Arts 1932; Third Prize, Boston (MA) Line Greeting Cards Contest; Illinois Federation of Women's Clubs; Commission from League for the Encouragement of Local Art, Chicago. She also illustrated The Tadwinkle Twins children’s book
