= Rudolph Reuter =

American classical pianist and educator (1888–1973)

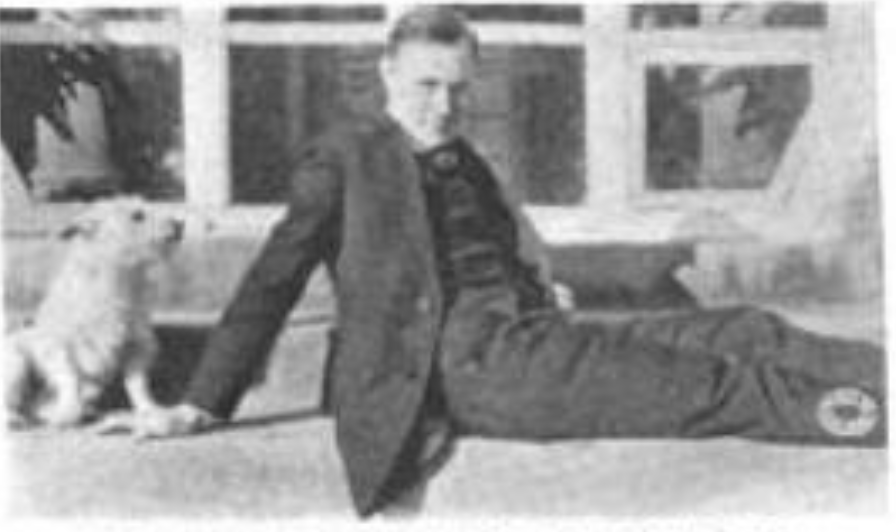
- Reuter in 1915, published in the Musical Courier
- Born: September 21, 1888; New York City, U.S.
- Died: January 4, 1973 (aged 84)
- Occupations: Pianist; music professor
- Years active: 1908–1973
- Musical career
- Genres: Classical

Rudolph Reuter (September 21, 1888 – January 4, 1973) was an American pianist and professor.

== Early life, education and early career ==
Reuter came from a musical family; his father and grandfather were members of the New York Philharmonic.

As a child, he performed as a boy soprano for the St. James' Episcopal Church in Manhattan, and later as the organist for the North New York Congregational Church in the Bronx.

While still a teenager, he traveled to Berlin, where he studied with Karl Heinrich Barth and Max Bruch. He made his European debut in 1908 with the Hamburg Philharmonic, playing the Brahms Piano Concerto No. 1.

== Adult career ==
In 1909, he was invited to take a position as professor of piano and music theory at the Imperial Academy in Tokyo.

Reuter was the first pianist to perform the piano works of Debussy in Japan, playing the Sarabande from Pour le piano in 1909, and the Toccata from the same suite in 1911.

He returned to the United States in 1912, being concerned that his geographic distance from the United States and Europe was "endanger[ing]" his "whole musical future".

He developed an active career as a soloist and teacher based in Chicago, Illinois. In 1920, he was the first pianist to give a public performance of Charles Tomlinson Griffes's revised piano sonata; the Chicago Tribune critic praised Reuter's playing of the piece, citing the pianist's "enthusiasm and excellent musical understanding", but dismissed the sonata out-of-hand as "wholly meaningless and useless musical material." The critic for Musical America offered even more trenchant criticism: "Especially noteworthy was his first performance from manuscript, of a sonata in four divisions, but in one movement, by Charles T. Griffes. This work by the Southern [sic] composer, hardly measures up to his many compositions we have heard, either in thematic worth or harmonic texture. The short thematic materials and the vague harmonic meanderings, leave the hearer in uncertain mood as to the meaning of the entire work. Mr. Reuter played the sonata with virile and straight forward style, but even his excellent performance could not rescue the sonata from its drab dullness."

Reuter taught for many years in Chicago, first at the Chicago Musical College, then at the American Conservatory of Music.
