= Carl Friedberg =

German pianist and teacher

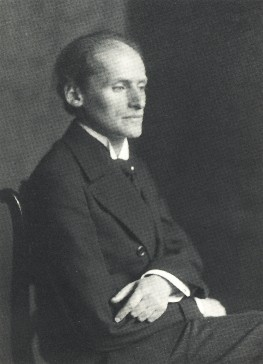
- Carl Friedberg; photograph by Jacob Hilsdorf

Background information
- Born: September 18, 1872; Bingen
- Died: September 9, 1955 (aged 82) Merano, Italy
- Genre: Classical
- Occupation: Teacher
- Instrument: Piano
- Years active: 1892–1955

Carl Rudolf Hermann Friedberg (September 18, 1872 in Bingen, Germany – September 9, 1955 in Merano, Italy) was a German pianist and teacher of Jewish origin.

== Biography ==
Tall wwith Carl Friedberg by Harriette Brower

He was son of Eduard Friedberg (?–1937) and Elisa Landau (1844–1926) from Bingen. The Friedberg were wine merchants in Bingen since 1700.

Friedberg studied piano with James Kwast and with Clara Schumann at the Hoch Conservatory, Frankfurt. He became a teacher there (1893–1904) and later at the Cologne Conservatory (1904–1914). From 1923 until his retirement in 1946, Carl Friedberg was principal piano teacher at the New York Institute of Musical Art (the institution which become the Juilliard School of Music from 1926). His pupils include Gertrude Lightstone Mittelmann, William Browning, Malcolm Frager, Edith Weiss-Mann, Bruce Hungerford, Reginald Bedford, Nina Simone, William Masselos, Frances Ziffer, and Elly Ney. See: List of music students by teacher: C to F#Carl Friedberg.

Friedberg's career as a performer spanned over 60 years in both Europe and America. He made his official debut in 1892 with the Vienna Philharmonic Orchestra under Mahler. This performance received a positive review from Edward Hanslick.

In 1893 he had given an all-Brahms recital in the presence of the composer, who highly admired his playing and who later coached him in private on the performance of the majority of his piano works. As a chamber musician he replaced Artur Schnabel in the Schnabel-Flesch-Becker Trio in 1920 and played in that ensemble until 1932. Friedberg gave many recitals with Fritz Kreisler throughout America and in 1937 formed his own trio with Daniel Karpilowsky and Felix Salmond.

Though widely known to disdain the sound of the recorded piano, Friedberg did, at age 81 (1953) record a single commercial LP for Zodiac Records (LPZ-1001), released in two editions (limited early release with pink cover and full, later release with piano graphic) Unreleased takes from this recording session were released 30 years later on IPAM1102 and 1103. Although Friedberg's repertory was wide, he became associated with the music of Beethoven, and especially of Schumann and Brahms.

In 1955, at age 82, he planned a concert tour in Europe. He took an ocean liner to Italy, but contracted pneumonia on board. He went to Meran (Merano) for a cure, but died and is buried there.
