= Louise Robyn =

American composer and educator

Margaret Louise Robyn (23 April 1878 - 10 June 1949) was an American composer, music educator, and pianist who taught for many years at the American Conservatory of Music in Chicago, serving as director for at least one year. Her piano pedagogy methods and books are still in use today. She published and taught as Louise Robyn.

Robyn was born in Cedar Rapids, Iowa, to Mary Ann O'Reilly and William Robyn, a merchant. Little is known about her education. She began working at the American Conservatory of Music in 1901, where she taught advanced piano and teacher training. She also chaired the children's department and in 1937 served as Director of the conservatory. Her students included Marie Christine Bergersen, Storm Bull, Jack Fascinato, Irwin Fischer, Robert Fizdale, Marion Roberts, and Ruth Crawford Seeger. In 1939, Music Clubs Magazine reported at least one Louise Robyn Club in Detroit, Michigan.

Robyn collaborated on some publications with Howard Hanks, Louise Johnson, Mildred Ross, and Florence White Williams. She produced many works, all for piano or early childhood music education, which were published by Clayton F. Summy Co., Lyon & Healy, Inc., Oliver Ditson, Robyn Teaching Service, Theodore Presser Company, and Winthrop Rogers Ltd., and include:

- Broken Chord and Arpeggio Chart: with Walking and Mountain Climbing Exercises
- Child Christ: Storied Scenes from the Childhood of Christ
- Chord Crafters: Introducing the Eight Fundamental Chord Attacks
- How to Teach the Piano to the Beginner
- Keyboard Town
- Let’s Play Leap Frog
- Peter Pan Picture Suite (with illustrations)
- Rhythmic Exercises as an Approach to the Piano
- Robyn-Gurlitt Album
- Robyn-Hanks Harmony Books #1 and 2 (with Howard Hanks)
- Robyn Rote-cards (with Florence White Williams)
- Short Etudes with Ornaments for Piano
- The Ornament Family: Preparation for Playing the Bach Ornaments
- Teaching Musical Notation with Picture Symbols
- Technic Tale (3 volumes)
