= Silvio Scionti =

Italian-born American pianist and teacher

- Born: 20 November 1882; Acireale, Italy
- Died: 22 May 1973 (aged 90) Rome, Italy
- Genre: Classical
- Occupations: Musician, teacher
- Instrument: Piano
- Spouse: Isabel Scionti
- Award: Order of the Star of Italian Solidarity (1956)

Silvio Vittore Alberto Scionti (Italian: [ˈʃonti]; born 20 November 1882; d 22 May 1973) was an Italian-born American pianist and teacher. Born in Acireale, Sicily, he trained at the Royal Conservatory in Naples. He eventually settled in the United States, teaching at the American Conservatory of Music, the Chicago Musical College, and North Texas State College (now the University of North Texas College of Music) from 1942 to 1953, and privately in the Dallas area. He performed as a soloist numerous times with the Chicago and Minneapolis orchestras, and frequently gave recitals. In the 1920s, he toured the United States performing piano duos with former student Stell Andersen. After 1935, he and his wife Isabel toured Europe, Mexico, and the United States. He also recorded a handful of piano rolls.

Scionti died in Rome.

== Honors and awards ==
- 1956 — Order of the Star of Italian Solidarity, by the Italian Government

== Former students ==
- Stell Andersen
- Monte Hill Davis
- Ivan Davis
- Jeaneane Jo Dowis (1932–2013), married Samuel Lipman (1934–1994), pianist and co-founding editor of The New Criterion
- James Robert Floyd
- Jack Guerry
- Mary Nan Hudgins
- Jonetta Miller Hinkle
- Lucy Scarbrough
- Alice Downs
- Jonathan Woods

== Published works ==
- Silvio Scionti, The Road to Piano Artistry; a collection of classic and romantic compositions, with interpretative and technical comment, Carl Fischer, Inc. (©1944; ©1947) (OCLC 3316099) (LCCN 45-13332)
- Silvio Scionti, Album of Selected Classics for Piano, G. Ricordi, New York (©1940) (OCLC 20586306)
- Silvio Scionti, Essays on Artistic Piano Playing,, compiled by Jack Guerry, University of North Texas Press (©1998) (ISBN 0585235821; electronic book) (ISBN 1574410415) (LCCN 97-41858) (OCLC 44962515)
- Silvio Scionti, Silvio Scionti's system of piano artistry, L'Arte pianistica, A revised exposition of all fundamental principles of piano technique, Edizioni Curci, Milan (©1961)

== Discography ==
- The piano artistry of Silvio and Isabel Scionti (CD), published by Jack Guerry, Louisiana State University (1990) (OCLC 36348353)

Remastered from Welte-Mignon or Ampico reproducing piano rolls or from commercial 78 rpm recordings
