= Karl Heinrich Barth =

German musician (1847–1922)

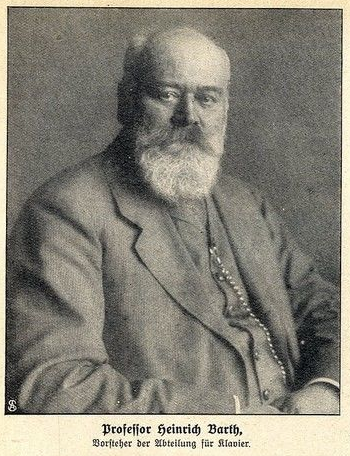
Heinrich Barth (1912)

Karl Heinrich Barth (12 July 1847 – 23 December 1922) was a German pianist and pedagogue.

== Life and early training ==
Karl Heinrich Barth was born in Pillau, East Prussia (modern day Baltiysk, Russia). Little is known about Barth's early life, except that his first piano lessons were given by his father. At the age of nine, following initial lessons with his father, Heinrich Barth moved to Potsdam to study with Ludwig Seinmann. Barth's later teachers included significant 19th century pianists, including Hans von Bülow and Karl Tausig, both of whom were students of Franz Liszt. Barth established his career as soloist, chamber musician, and teacher across Europe. He died in Berlin on 23 December 1922.

== Teaching career ==
In 1868, Barth accepted his first major teaching position as professor of piano at the Stern Conservatory. He moved to the Berlin Hochschule für Musik in 1871, becoming chair of the piano department in 1910. He would remain there until his retirement in 1921. While working at the Berlin Hochschule für Musik, his pupils included Arthur Rubinstein, Heinrich Neuhaus, Wilhelm Kempff, Leonard Liebling, Siegfried Schultze and Rose and Ottilie Sutro. Other students included Katherine Ruth Heyman, Rudolph Reuter, Ernest Schelling, and Carl Adolph Preyer. Barth's pupils remember his teaching style as being stern, and that his expectations were high for his students.

== Performing career ==
While living in Berlin, Barth served as court pianist to Kaiser Friedrich III of Prussia. He also frequently performed in public with the violinist, conductor and composer Joseph Joachim and with Joachim's wife, the singer Amalie Weiss. He formed a piano trio with the violinist Heinrich Karl Hermann de Ahna and the cellist Robert Hausmann, which was well known and widely celebrated. Throughout his performing career, Barth frequently performed the works of Johannes Brahms, whom Barth knew personally.
