= Max Trapp =

German composer and teacher (1887 - 1971)

Hermann Emil Alfred Max Trapp (November 1, 1887 – May 31, 1971) was a German composer and teacher. A prestigious figure in the Berlin cultural scene during the 1930s, Trapp, amongst others in the Nazi-influenced scene, was regularly invited to contribute to concert programs and competitions.

Trapp was born in Berlin and attended the Berlin Hochschule für Musik (now the Berlin University of the Arts) where he studied under Paul Juon and Ernő Dohnányi. After the completion of his studies, he did not have regular employment and worked as an itinerant pianist. In 1920, however, he obtained a post as lecturer at the Berlin conservatoire, becoming a professor there in 1926. His best-known pupils include Josef Tal, Saburō Moroi and Günter Raphael.

Between 1926 and 1930, Trapp offered a master class in composition at the music conservatoire in Dortmund. In 1932 he joined the NSDAP. In June 1933, Trapp joined the Nazi movement through an "Appeal to the Creative" (Appell an die Schaffenden). In 1934, he stepped down from the Berlin conservatoire and became the director of a masterclass in composition at the Berlin Academy of Arts (since merged with the University of the Arts). Here from 1936 until 1939 he taught Sophie Carmen Eckhardt-Gramatté. In 1940, Trapp received the national composition prize. From 1950 to 1953, he was a teacher at Berlin's Städtischen Konservatorium.

He died at the age of 83 in Berlin.

== Works ==
Heavily influenced by Richard Strauss and Max Reger, Trapp composed orchestral, chamber and piano works, including seven symphonies, as well as choral and theatre music. While his music was fairly widely performed through the 1940s, it has rarely been performed since.

Concerto for Pianoforte in D Major, Op. 26 (1931)

- Mae Doelling Schmidt (1888–1965), on November 29, 1934, performed the American premier of Trapp's 1931 piano concerto with the Chicago Symphony in Orchestra Hall, Frederick Stock conducting. Schmidt had actually performed the concerto at a private event March 3, 1934, at the College Club in Madison, Wisconsin.
- Walter Gieseking (1895–1956), on October 24, 1935, performed Trapp's 1931 piano concerto in Amsterdam with the Royal Concertgebouw Orchestra, Willem Mengelberg conducting. Audiophile Classics (APL 101.542), a label of Blaricum Music Group of the Netherlands, released a CD of the performance in 2001.
