= Heniot Levy =

American musician (1879–1945)

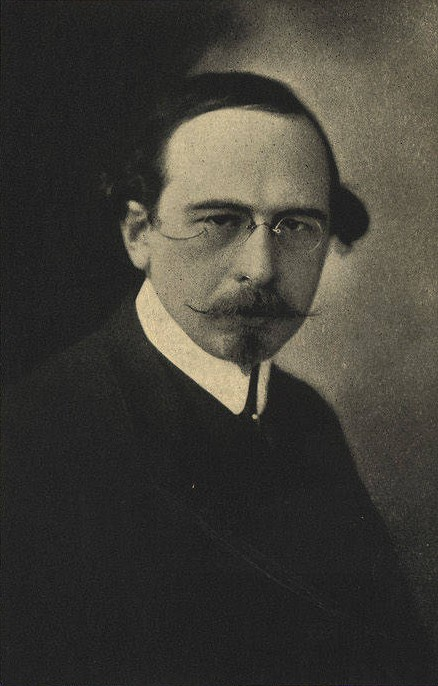
Heniot Lévy in 1920

Heniot Lévy (19 July 1879 – 16 June 1945) was an American composer, teacher, and pianist of Polish birth. A native of Warsaw, he trained at the Hochschule für Musik in Berlin with Oscar Raif and Karl Heinrich Barth, both pupils of Tausig; the latter also trained Arthur Rubinstein. Lévy made his debut touring with the Berlin Philharmonic in 1898. He came to the United States in 1905, settling in Chicago, Illinois. Lévy taught at the American Conservatory of Music; he toured and performed with the orchestras of Chicago and Minneapolis. As a composer he wrote mainly chamber music, and he recorded a handful of piano rolls, including some of his own work.

Levy died in 1945. He was the maternal grandfather of Igor Kipnis.

== See also ==
- "MusicSack". for a list of biographical references (gives 1946 for year of death.)
