= Chas A. Stevens =

Chas A. Stevens was a Chicago department store. It started in 1886 as a catalog business and eventually grew to 29 locations in the Chicago metropolitan area. In 1988 the chain filed for bankruptcy and liquidated.

Its flagship State Street store was the hub of fashion during the 1940s, 50s and 60s in Chicago. It featured six floors of exclusively women's clothing. The top floor housed a beauty salon named The Powder Box, and employed more than 50 operators. The salon was noted for catering to visiting celebrities and dignitaries. Window displays at the store received several awards for design and display.

The store's State Street building was built in 1912, and is still standing as of 2023.
