= American Conservatory of Music =

Defunct school of music in Chicago, Illinois, U.S.

Coordinates: 41°52′35″N 87°37′29″W

- Type: Private
- Active: 1886–1991
- Location: Chicago

The American Conservatory of Music (ACM) was a private music school from 1886 to 1991 in Chicago, Illinois, United States. The Illinois Board of Higher Education serves as the custodian of records for the school following the its closure.

It was a major American school of music founded in Chicago in 1886 by John James Hattstaedt (1851–1931). The conservatory was incorporated as an Illinois non-profit corporation. It developed the Conservatory Symphony Orchestra and had numerous student recitals. The oldest private degree-granting music school in the Midwestern United States, it was located in Chicago until 1991.

That year, 1991, its board of trustees—chaired by Frederic Wilbur Hickman—voted to close the institution, file for Chapter 7 bankruptcy, liquidate the assets, and dissolve the corporation. The conservatory closed at the end of the semester, in May 1991.

An organization based in Hammond, Indiana, uses the name "American Conservatory of Music" and identifies as the reorganized continuation of the Chicago institution. It also has a base in Belize that was founded in 1886 and is currently led by Theodora Schultze.

== History ==
John James Hattstaedt, a musician who had taught piano in Detroit, Michigan and St. Louis, Missouri, moved to Chicago, Illinois, in 1875. A center of railroad lines connecting to the East Coast and the resource-rich Great Lakes area, it was booming as a center of business, industry and culture. In 1886 he established the American Conservatory of Music, which became the oldest private, degree-granting school of music in the Midwest.

Hattstaedt was founding president and continued his direction until he became ill, six months before his death in 1931. He had expanded the school, attracting talented faculty and students. A Conservatory Symphony Orchestra was developed. In addition to the regular faculty, the conservatory attracted artists who conducted master classes in their specialties. In 1931 the conservatory had 3,000 students.

In the later 20th century, the conservatory appeared to suffer from its lack of affiliation with a university, which would have provided access to a wider circle of programs and donors. But it still served urban students and in 1977 had 2,000 students. At least in the early 1970s, accredited academic coursework was provided by the University of Chicago Extension which had classroom facilities in downtown Chicago's "Loop" district. Enrollment declined more markedly in the 1980s. Many other music schools were also under pressure and struggling financially. In 1986 ACM entered Chapter 11 bankruptcy proceedings.

Under the presidency of Vernon R. Nelson, the school moved to more modern quarters in the Stevens Building, 17 N. State Street, and attracted new faculty. He gained several major gifts from donors and foundations, including a $1 million grant from the Marquette Charitable Trust.

But by spring of 1991, enrollment was down to 90 full-time students, 60 fewer than expected. The conservatory announced it would close in May at the end of the semester. Chicago Musical College offered contracts to many of the conservatory faculty, and offered to have students enroll there to complete their studies and degrees.

== Leadership ==
=== Conservatory presidents ===
- 1886–1931: John James Hattstaedt (1851–1931)
- 1935–1971: John Robert Hattstaedt (1887–1978), son of the founder, took over as president four years after his father's death. In between, his mother Kate Hattstaedt had served as president.
- 1971–1981: Leo Edward Heim (1913–1992) In 1981, the conservatory named him president emeritus. But in 1987–1991, he was instrumental in the attempt to save the conservatory after it had filed for bankruptcy under Chapter 7.
- 1980–1987: Charles Ethelbert Moore (1930–1995), a classical pianist who later taught at DePaul University, was president when the conservatory filed for Chapter 11 bankruptcy in January 1987. Moore had joined the faculty in 1961 and became dean in 1972.
- 1987–1989: Vernon R. Nelson (born 1945), a graduate of the University of Chicago's Graduate School of Business, temporarily saved the conservatory, extending its life until 1991.
- 1989–1990: Steven J. Nelson (no relation to Vernon)
- 1990–1991: Vernon R. Nelson

=== General directors ===
- 1900–1903: Frederick Grant Gleason
- 1937 Louise Robyn

=== Deans of faculty ===
- circa 1942: Heniot Levy
- post-WWII to the late 1960s: Irwin Fischer
- circa mid-1980s: E. Harvey Jewell, DMA
- 1972-1981: Leo Edward Heim
- late 1980s: Carl L. Waldschmidt, PhD

=== Department deans ===
- circa early 1900s: Adolf Weidig, associate director and dean of the department of theory

== Faculty, guest teachers and associates ==
For over a century, many prominent artists, including some who had their musical training in Europe, taught master classes in piano and other instruments at the American Conservatory. Among them were pianist Josef Lhévinne from the Soviet Union, a colleague of Sergei Rachmaninoff, and his student Adele Marcus. Both taught primarily at the Juilliard School in New York City.

From the post-WWII years to the late 1960s, Irwin Fischer, composer, pianist, and conductor, served as dean of faculty and conductor of the American Conservatory Orchestra. Violinist Scott Willits coached many members of the Chicago Symphony Orchestra from 1940 to 1974. Acclaimed pianist William Browning, heir of the Brahms-Schumann piano dynasty and one of the legendary pianists and teachers of the 20th century, was on faculty from 1957 to 1989. Pianist Wilhelmina Pouget, student of Walter Gieseking, specialized in late Romantic piano technique in the 1970s.

=== Notable faculty members ===
- Warren Benfield (1913–2001), double-bass
- David Scull Bispham (1857–1921)
- Bobby Broom (born 1961), taught jazz guitar at ACM from 1986 to 1990
- William Browning (1924–1997), piano
- Edward Joseph Collins (1886-1951), piano
- Jacques Gordon (1897–1948)
- Ervin Kleffman (1892–1987)
- Heniot Levy (1879–1945)
- Josef Lhévinne (1874–1944)
- Wilhelm Middelschulte (1863–1943)
- Rudolph Reuter (1888-1973), piano
- Louise Robyn (1878-1949)
- Mae Doelling Schmidt (1889–1965), piano
- Silvio Scionti (1882–1973), piano
- Henry Sopkin (1903–1988), conductor of the Conservatory Symphony Orchestra
- Leo Sowerby (1895–1968)
- Albert Pearson Stewart (1907–1991), director Purdue Musical Organizations
- Charles Vernon, bass trombone
- Adolf Weidig (1867–1931), music theory
- Grace Welsh (1895 -1999), piano
- Marie Sidenius Zendt (1882–1968), voice

== Alumni ==
=== Pulitzer Prize for Music recipients ===
- 1946 – Leo Sowerby (1895–1968), pianist & composer, Master of Music 1918
- 1952 – Gail Kubik (1914–1984), Master of Music 1936
- 1976 – Ned Rorem (born 1923), studied with Leo Sowerby 1938–1939
- 1979 – Joseph Schwantner (born 1943), Bachelor of Music 1964
- 1986 – George Perle (1915–2009), Master of Music 1942
- 2016 – Henry Threadgill (born 1944), Bachelor of Music 1974

=== Other notable alumni ===
- Robert Theodore Anderson
- E Mark Andersen, composer and organist
- Victor Arden
- Eden Atwood
- Thurman Barker
- Walter Barnes
- Wishart Bryan Bell
- Edward Bland
- Mwata Bowden
- Edith Borroff
- Storm Bull
- Paul Callaway
- Edo Castro
- William Rogers Chapman, pianist, conductor, composer, and impresario
- Edward Joseph Collins
- William Levi Dawson
- Jack DeJohnette (piano)
- Mae Doelling
- Richard Dufallo
- Amy Ellerman
- Robert Fizdale
- Zelma Watson George
- Floyd Freeman Graham
- Kirby Grant Hoon, Jr.
- Kurt Kaiser
- Donald M. Kendrick
- Dina Koston
- Robert E. Kreutz
- Gail Kubik
- Norman Luboff
- Maurice McAdow
- Barbara McNair
- Dennis Morgan
- Paul Parmelee
- John W. Peterson
- Madalyn Akers Phillips, composer, organist
- Florence Price
- Robert O. Ragland, film score composer, conductor, orchestrator
- Joseph John Richards
- Brad Richter
- Reginald Robinson
- Helen Roessing
- Mildred Barnes Royse composer
- Olive Nelson Russell composer, organist, pianist
- Kenn Smith, guitarist, bassist, composer
- Francisco Santiago
- Ruth Crawford Seeger, composer and musicologist
- Henry Sopkin (1903–1988), conductor
- Leon Stein, composer
- Lennie Tristano
- John Walker, organist
- Valerie Wellington
- Grace Welsh
- Helen Searles Westbrook, composer and organist
- Jeanette Williams
- Eldee Young, jazz double-bassist

=== Recipients of honorary doctorates ===
- 1938 — Cecil Burleigh (1885–1980)
- 1938 — Earl Vincent Moore (1890–1987)
- 1950 — Tauno Hannikainen (1896–1968)
- 1951 — MusD, Wilfred Conwell Bain (1908–1997), Dean of University of North Texas College of Music & Jacobs School of Music
- 1987 — George Perle (1915–2009), 1986 recipient of the Pulitzer Prize for Music, received his honorary doctorate at the conservatory's 100th anniversary commencement
- 1990 — Vernon R. Nelson, president, American Conservatory of Music

== Former locations ==
- ????–1975: 410 S. Michigan Avenue, Chicago, Fine Arts Building
- 1975–1987: 116 S. Michigan Avenue, Chicago
- 1987–1991: 17 N. State Street, Chicago, Stevens Building

== 1975–1991 restructuring efforts ==
=== 1975 acquisition & 1983 sale of building ===
In 1975, using funds from its endowment, the conservatory acquired and renovated a 17-story, 105,400-square-foot "turn-of-the-century" office building at 116 S. Michigan for about $1.2 million and moved from the Fine Arts Building at 410 S. Michigan Avenue. The conservatory's strategy was to occupy part of the building and earn enough rent income to cover some losses. But that plan failed, and in 1983, the conservatory sold the building to developer Horwitz Matthews, Inc. — Tem H. Horwitz (born 1944) and E. Curtis Matthews Jr. (born 1943) — who launched their own $4.5 million renovation. That year, they gave the conservatory, which had been occupying 25,000 square feet on 4-1/2 floors, two years to find new quarters for its 125 faculty members and 250 full-time and 800 part-time students.

=== 1987 Chapter 11 bankruptcy ===
In January 1987, the conservatory filed for Chapter 11 bankruptcy protection; and shortly thereafter, Charles Moore, its president, resigned. Henry Regnery – an industrialist, publisher of conservative books, benefactor, and amateur cellist – asked Vernon Nelson to step in as acting president. Nelson – an engineer with an MBA from the University of Chicago – had, since 1986, been leading a group from the University of Chicago to design a business plan for the conservatory. Nelson agreed to serve as president for a short time on a pro-bono basis. Many of the directors resigned shortly after the Chapter 11 bankruptcy filing.

=== Directors who stayed on during Chapter 11 reorganization ===
- Henry Regnery (1912–1996) remained as chairman
- Fred Hickman, (born 1927) an attorney and former U.S. Assistant Secretary of the Treasury for Tax Policy from 1971 to 1975 under Presidents Nixon and Ford
- Leo Edward Heim (1913–1992), a career Conservatory faculty member and former president
- Bernard James McKenna (1933–2010), the CEO of Sanwa Business Credit Corp, chaired in 1987 the conservatory's new building committee; he served as a Conservatory director from 1985 to 1992
- Robert (Bob) Getz, a musician and alumnus

=== New directors who joined to help reorganization ===
- Walter D. Fackler (1921–1993) a professor of economics, former acting dean, and director of the Executive MBA program of the University of Chicago's Graduate School of Business and former senior economist for U.S. President Dwight D. Eisenhower's Cabinet Committee from 1959 to 1960
- Henry Fogel, then the president of The Chicago Symphony Orchestra and as of June 2009, Dean of the Chicago College of Performing Arts
- Vernon R. Nelson
- J. Thomas Freidheim (born 1945), a Chicago insurance company executive

Hickman's firm, Hopkins & Sutter, handled the bankruptcy, pro-bono.

=== Other directors ===
- Ruth Anderson (née Teninga; born 1918), philanthropist from Hinsdale, Illinois, wife of Roger Allen Anderson (1919–2005)
- Paul J. Henry (born 1953), Conservatory faculty member – classical guitar
- Fumio Ralph Fujimoto (born 1923), partner (now retired), Ernst & Young
- Norman A. Ross (1922–2008), second generation journalist & broadcaster, and son of Olympic swimmer Norman Ross

=== Efforts to reorganize ===
In 1987, Regnery led with a $1 million gift to the conservatory. Other foundations followed. This provided operating capital to run the conservatory during the restructuring. Under the Deanship of E. Harvey Jewell, DMA (born 1942), the conservatory strengthened its programs, raised entrance requirements, recruited prominent faculty, passed a rigorous accreditation review in 1988 by the National Association of Schools of Music, and cleared a probationary status placed earlier by the Illinois State Board of Education on the Bachelor of Music Education program. After eighteen months, the conservatory had developed a survival plan and raised enough money to provide a balanced budget for three years. If the milestones were met, the conservatory would be able to function independently going forward. When Nelson expressed to the board his desire to leave his pro bono post, the board accepted it and launched a nationwide search for a new president and a dean. The board hired Steven J. Nelson, as president, and Carl L. Waldschmidt, PhD (1917–1995), the former dean, longtime music professor, and choral director from Concordia University in Chicago (retired 1987), as dean. Steve Nelson had studied violin at Cleveland Institute of Music and had served as president of the Center for Creative Studies – Institute of Music and Dance in Detroit. After leaving the American Conservatory of Music, Steve Nelson served as vice president college of relations at Landmark College in Putney, Vermont. In 1998, he became head master at the Calhoun School in New York City. Vern Nelson remained on the board.

=== 1991 Chapter 7 bankruptcy ===
By late 1990 it was clear to the board of directors that the milestones of the survival plan would not be met. In January 1991, the board reappointed Vern Nelson as president, pro bono. Grants totaling $2 million had been depleted by faculty salaries, student scholarships, and recruitment and development programs. Enrollment had fallen to 90 – down from 2,000 full-time in 1977. The board determined that, in order to survive, the conservatory would have to be merged with another entity. Discussions were held with the Northwestern University School of Music, which had an interest in developing a Downtown presence to house the performance department with better access to members of the Chicago Symphony Orchestra and the Lyric Opera. Discussions were also held with Roosevelt University to merge the conservatory with its Chicago Musical College. The board felt that prospects were viable, but a merger of any sort was resisted by members of conservatory faculty.

Then, when faced with financial failure from, among other things, no viable operating funds or other prospects for survival, the board closed the school in 1991 and filed for protection under Chapter 7 bankruptcy. The main secured creditor was the landlord, Morris Kalish, who owned the Stevens Building at 17 N State Street, a 19-story building erected in 1913 which had housed the Chas A. Stevens Department Store. At the invitation of Kalish, the conservatory had taken up residence on the top two floors in 1987.

== Efforts to resurrect the bankrupt conservatory ==
- See American Conservatory of Music (Hammond, Indiana & Belize)
