= Adolf Weidig =

American composer (1867–1931)

Adolf H. A. Weidig (28 November 1867, in Hamburg, Germany – 23 September 1931) was an American composer who was born and raised in Hamburg. After extensive musical studies in Europe, including at the Academy of Music, Munich, he immigrated to the United States in 1892 as a young man.

He wrote numerous pieces for orchestra, including a symphony and the tone poem Semiramis; among his chamber works are three string quartets and a string quintet. He also wrote songs. He died in Hinsdale, Illinois.

For years Weidig served as Associate Director of the American Conservatory of Music in Chicago and was Dean of the Department of Theory in the same. His composition students included harpist Helena Stone Torgerson, pianists Frances Marion Ralston and Theodora Troendle, organist Helen Searles Westbrook, and, most notably, composer Ruth Crawford Seeger. He wrote the book Harmonic Material and its Uses in 1924 to aid as a reference in his composition classes.
