= Kenneth Hesketh discography =

This is the discography of British composer Kenneth Hesketh.

== Contemporary Classical ==
Title	Artist(s)	Label	Item No.
The deeper the blue...	Britten Sinfonia, Janet Sung, Jac van Steen, Simon Callaghan	Somm Recordings	SOMMCD 275
Diatoms	The Green Duo	Prima Facie	PFCD095
In Ictu Oculi (Orchestral Works)	BBC National Orchestra of Wales, Christoph-Mathias Mueller	Paladino Music	PMR 0092
A Land So Luminous	The Continuum Ensemble & Philip Headlam	Prima Facie	B01JHNT33KB01JHNT33K
Horae (pro Clara) Works for solo piano	Clare Hammond	BIS	BIS 2913
Wunderkammer(konzert) Works for large ensemble & orchestra	Royal Liverpool PO, Christoph-Mathias Mueller (conductor), Ensemble 10/10, Clark Rundell (conductor)	NMC Recordings	B00AQZU9SC
Theatre of Attractions Works for chamber ensemble	Psappha, Nicholas Kok (conductor)	Psappha	B00AUKGH0M
Three Japanese Miniatures	Clare Hammond	Prima Facie	B006JFZU3W
Notte Oscura	Peter O'Hagan	UHR	02011021
Point Forms (after Kandinsky)	Mark Simpson/Ian Buckle	NMC Recordings	NMC D139
Detail from the Record	London Sinfonietta/Knussen	London Sinfonietta	SINF CD2-2009
Polygon Window	Warp Works & Twentieth Century Masters (2006) Aphex Twin arr. Kenneth Hesketh	WARP RECORDS	WARPCD144

== Wind ==
Title	Artist(s)	Label	Item No.
Danceries (set 1)	University of Calgary Wind Ensemble/Glenn D Price	Arktos	2001 48 CD
Danceries (set 1)	Showa Wind Symphony/Eugene Corporon	Cafua	CACG-0032
Danceries (set 1)	Royal Northern College of Music Wind Orchestra/Clark Rundell	Chandos	CHAN10284
Danceries (set 2)	Her Majesty's Royal Marines Portsmouth/Nick Grace	Chevron Records	CHVCD 46
Diaghilev Dances	RNCM Wind Orchestra/Clark Chandos Rundell	Chandos	CHAN 10409
Diaghilev Dances	North Texas Wind Symphony/Eugene Corporon	Klavier	Klavier 11144
Diaghilev Dances	University of Kentucky Wind Ensemble/Timothy Reynish	Mark Records	4949-MCD
The Gilded Theatre	University of South Florida Wind Ensemble/John C. Carmichael, cond.	Mark Records	B00AA9QJ9W
Infernal Ride	Birmingham Symphonic Winds/Keith Allen	Mark Records	7221-MCD
Infernal Ride	University of St. Thomas Wind Ensemble/Matthew George	Innova Records	B001XJNZ40
Masque	The Band of Her Majesty's Royal Marines/Lt. Col. Chris Davies	Doyen	DOYCD191
Masque	North Texas Wind Symphony/Eugene Corporon	Klavier	Klavier 11127
Masque	Tokyo Kosei Wnd Orchestra	Kosei	KOCD-8010
Masque	Indiana University of Pennsylvania Wind Ensemble	Klavier	Klavier 1184
Vranjanka	Irish Youth Wind/Reynish	Mark Records	8655-MCD
Vranjanka	Irish Youth Wind/Reynish	Mark Records	7211-MCD

== Brass ==
Title	Artist(s)	Label	Item No.
Alchymist's Journal	The Leyland Band/Michael Fowles	Faber Music	0-571-52287-4
Alchymist's Journal	New Music for Brass Band - Foden's Richardson Band	NMC	NMC D142
Masque	The Leyland Band/Michael Fowles	Faber Music	0-571-52109-6
Masque	Yorkshire Building Society Band/David King	Polyphonic	QPRL 214D
Daneries	The Leyland Band/Michael Fowles	Faber Music	0-571-52109-6
Festive Overture Infernal Ride Elegy Whirligigg	The Leyland Band/Jason Katsikaris	Faber Music	0-571-52216-5

== Seasonal ==
Title	Artist(s)	Label	Item No.
Christmas Carols from the Liverpool Phil	RLPO and choirs/ Ian Tracey	RLPO Live	RLCD251
Spirit of Christmas	RLPO and choirs/ Ian Tracey	RLPO Live	RL2007
Rejoice! Christmas at The Sage Gateshead	Northern Sinfonia/ Simon Halsey	Avie	B005OU17FS
Lumen de lumine	Oriel College Choir/ David Maw	OxRecs DIGITAL	OXCD-139
