= Jonathan Byers =

Jonathan Byers may refer to:

- Jonathan Byers, musician in Badke Quartet
- Jonathan Byers (Stranger Things), fictional character in the TV series

== See also ==
- John Byers (disambiguation)
