= Karl Lutchmayer =

Pianist

Karl Lutchmayer is a British-Goan concert pianist, lecturer and writer.

== Background ==
Born in England to Indian parents, Lutchmayer began piano lessons at the age of six. He went on to study at the Royal College of Music with John Barstow and Peter Wallfisch, and with Lev Naumov at the Moscow Conservatoire. During his time at the Royal College of Music, he was a recipient of the Hopkinson Silver Medal, and after his graduation, later returned to the college as the Constant & Kit Lambert Fellow, as awarded by the Worshipful Company of Musicians.

In 2015, Karl was awarded the Bharat Gaurav (Pride Of India) Lifetime Achievement Award for his contributions to Western Classical Music in India, the UK, and internationally.

== Performing ==
Lutchmayer has performed world and UK premieres by numerous contemporary composers, including works by Julian Anderson and Kenneth Hesketh, Richard Causton's Inventions in One Part (which was written for and dedicated to him by the composer), and the premiere of Busoni's Indianishes Entrelied, 75 years after the composer's death.

As a solo pianist, he has performed on BBC Radio Three and Classic FM, and with orchestras in the UK and abroad, including the Bombay Chamber Orchestra, the Aylesbury Symphony Orchestra and the Calcutta Chamber Orchestra (performing works by Mozart and Finzi for their centenary celebrations gala). He frequently gives lecture recitals in his Conversational Concerts series, which was recently trademarked. In 2012, he became a Steinway Artist, and was received as a guest by the British ambassador in Tunis for his Liszt Bicentenary tour: as well as recitals in Tunisia, the tour included lectures and recitals in India, America and the UK, where he was supported by the Liszt Society. His performances of Alkan, another composer of his interest (see Educational Work), have also been praised by Lord Lipsey in British Parliament's Hansard.

As a chamber musician, he has performed as a member of the Continuum Ensemble, and at notable venues including the Southbank Centre (alongside Evelyn Glennie, Paul Lewis and Rainer Hersch) and the Purcell Room (to critical acclaim).

== Educational work ==
Lutchmayer was a professor at Trinity Laban Conservatoire of Music and Dance until 2018, and has lectured at numerous conservatoires and universities, including the Royal College of Music, Ithaca College and Bucknell University. He is also the current Director of the Trinity Laban Summer Academy in India, and holds a teaching position at Eltham College. He has delivered Proms Extra talks at the BBC Proms (later broadcast on BBC Radio 3), interviewed Sian Edwards and John Wilson as part of the Music Up Close and Music Talks series respectively, and he himself has been interviewed for Tunisian web-channel tunisie.co.

He has written articles for Time Out, Piano Professional and Almeida Theatre, and contributed to Dorling Kindersley's The Complete Guide To Classical Music. His areas of academic interest include Busoni, Liszt, Alkan, Enescu and the Creative Transcription Network. He has also given talks at the Riflemaker gallery. In 2016, Lutchmayer gave masterclasses at the Hyderabad Western Music Foundation (HWMF) as well.

== Personal life ==
Lutchmayer has an interest in classic cars, his own collection including a 1968 Triumph Spitfire and a 1965 Jaguar E-Type. He also plays the cornet recreationally, and is an occasional member of the Crystal Palace Brass Band.

== Premieres ==
Piece	Composer	Premiere	Date
Indianisches Erntelied	Ferrucio Busoni	World	23 February 1999
Somewhere Near Cluj	Julian Anderson	World	25 June 1999
Inventions in One Part	Richard Causton	World	15 June 2001
Three Japanese Miniatures	Kenneth Hesketh	UK	16 February 2003
Notte Oscura	Kenneth Hesketh	UK	16 November 2003
Exposure	Madelaine Jones	World	25 March 2017
Piano Concerto	Edwin Roxburgh	World	30 March 2017

== Recordings ==
CD	Piece	Composer
Reflets dans la Glace (2007, NMC)	Prelude & Toccata	Edwin Roxburgh
