= Jack Stamp =

American conductor and composer (born 1954)

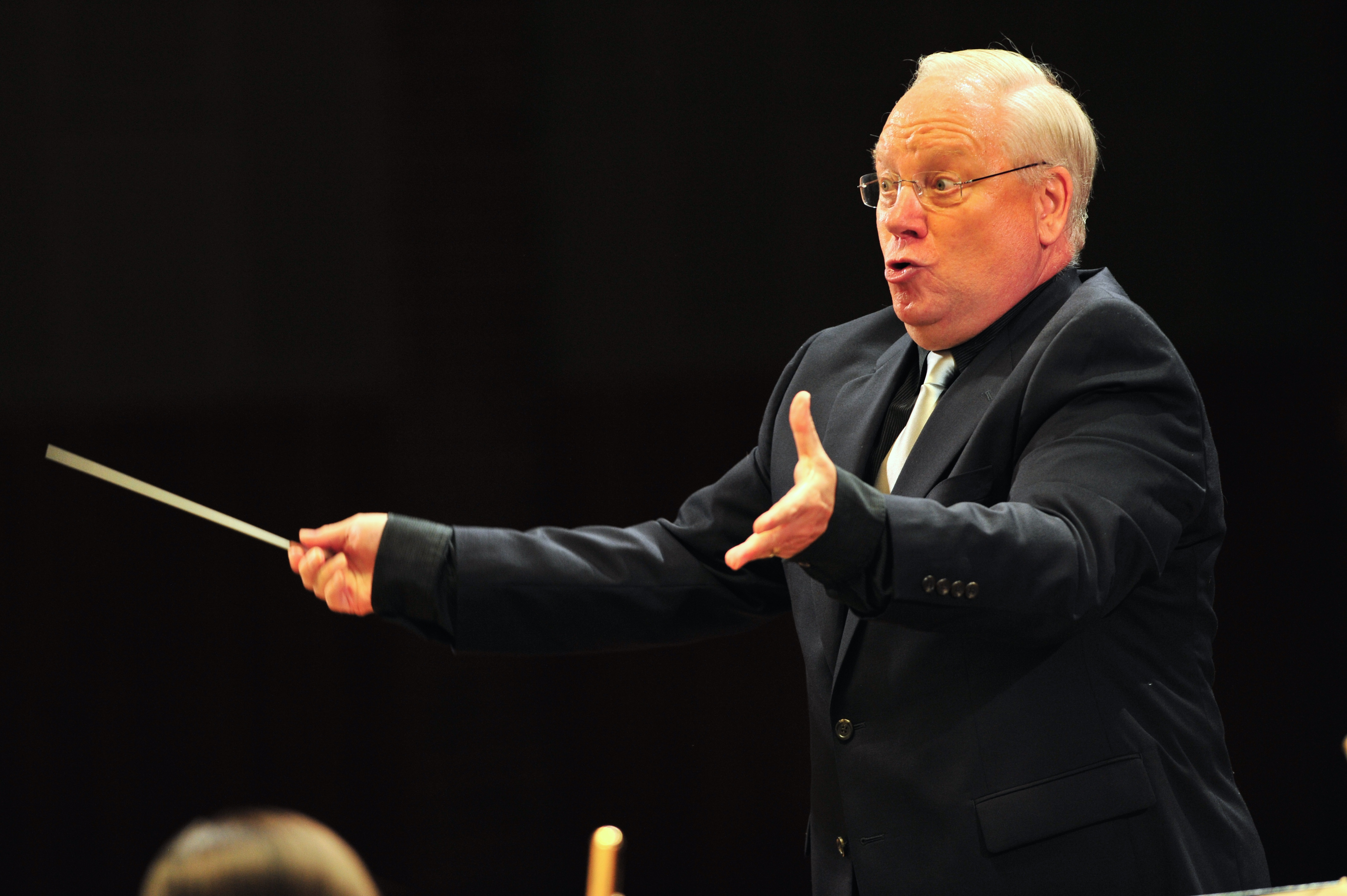
- Jack Stamp (2015)

Background information
- Born: March 5, 1954 (age 71); College Park, Maryland
- Genres: Contemporary
- Occupation(s): Composer, conductor

Jack Stamp (born March 5, 1954, in College Park, Maryland) is a North American wind ensemble conductor and composer. He has approximately sixty compositions available from Neil A. Kjos Music Company, including his most well-known piece, Gavorkna Fanfare, which was dedicated to Eugene Corporon. In 1993, he formed the Keystone Wind Ensemble, comprising students, alumni and professors at Indiana University of Pennsylvania, which has been recorded on 16 albums.

== Biography ==
Starting in 2015, Jack Stamp became an adjunct Professor of Music at the University of Wisconsin-River Falls where he teaches conducting. Prior to this appointment he served as Director of Band Studies at Indiana University of Pennsylvania for 25 years. In addition, he also served as chairperson of the music department for six years. He received his Bachelor of Science in Music Education degree from IUP, a Master's in Percussion Performance from East Carolina University, and a Doctor of Musical Arts Degree in Conducting from Michigan State University where he studied with Eugene Corporon.

Prior to his appointment at IUP, he served as chairman of the Division of Fine Arts at Campbell University in North Carolina. He also taught for several years at John T. Hoggard located in Wilmington, North Carolina (1979-1982). In addition to these posts, Dr. Stamp served as conductor of the Duke University Wind Symphony (1988–89) and was musical director of the Triangle Youth Brass Band, leading them to a national brass band championship in 1989.

Stamp's primary composition teachers were Robert Washburn and Fisher Tull, though he was strongly influenced by his music theory teachers at Indiana University of Pennsylvania and East Carolina. Other studies include work with noted American composers David Diamond, Joan Tower and Richard Danielpour.

He is active as a guest conductor, clinician, adjudicator, and composer throughout North America and Great Britain. His compositions have been commissioned and performed by leading military and university bands across the United States.

In 1996, he received the Orpheus Award from the Zeta Tau chapter of Phi Mu Alpha Sinfonia for service to music and was named a "Distinguished Alumnus" of Indiana University of Pennsylvania. In 1999, he received the "Citation of Excellence" from the Pennsylvania Music Educators Association. In 2000, he was inducted into the prestigious American Bandmasters Association. He was awarded the title of "University Professor" for the 2008-2009 academic year at IUP. This is the highest award the university gives to a professor.

Since 2017, he has been the conductor of the Mississippi River Brass Band on three European tours.

== See also ==
- Gavorkna Fanfare
- List of composers

== Selected Recordings ==
- GIA Composer's Collection: Jack Stamp
- Leroy Anderson - The Phantom Regiment and Other Tales
- The Composer's Voice: Band Music of Alfred Reed
- The Composer's Voice: Band Music of William Schuman
- The Composer's Voice: Band Music of H. Owen Reed including interview
- The Composer's Voice: Band Music of Norman Dello Joio including interview
- Out of the Depths - Music by African American Composers
- Cloudsplitter - Music Composed & Conducted by Jack Stamp
- Cornerstones of the British Band Repertoire
- Pageant: American Music for Symphonic Bands
- Dello Joio - Songs of Abelard and Other World Premieres
- Wind Visions: The Music of Samuel Adler
- Divertimento - Wind Music of American Composers
- Celebrations
- Night Fantasy - The Music of Robert Ward
- Past The Equinox - The Music of Jack Stamp

== Books and literature ==
- Larry Blocher, Ray Cramer, Eugene Corporon, Richard Miles (1988). Teaching Music Through Performance in Band, Volume 2 GIA Publications.
