= Kenneth Hesketh =

British composer (born 1968)

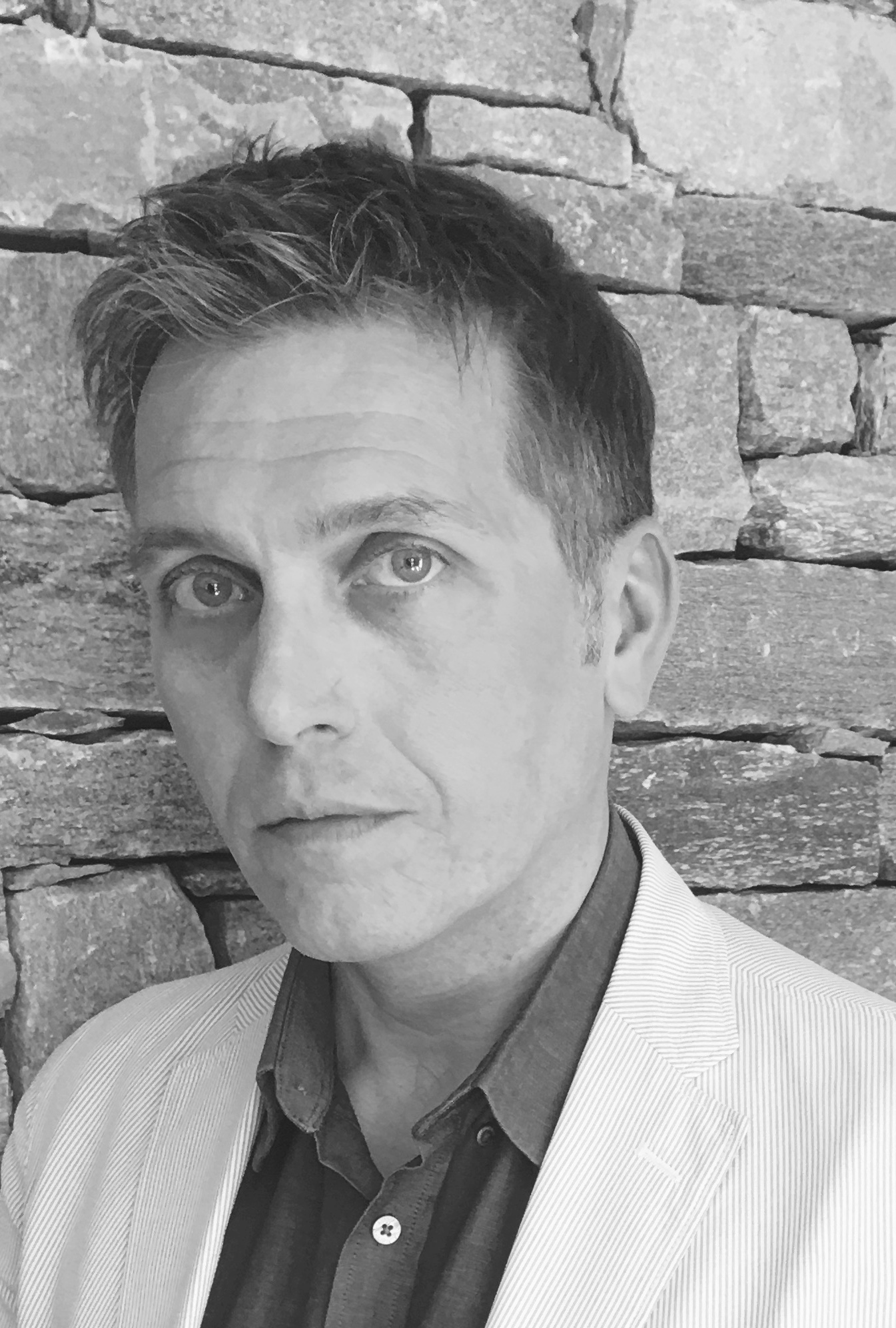

Background information
- Born: Kenneth Hesketh; 20 July 1968 (age 58); Liverpool, United Kingdom
- Genres: Contemporary classical
- Occupation: Composer Orchestrator
- Instruments: Piano
- Labels: BIS Records, NMC Recordings, London Sinfonietta, Psappha, Prima Facie, SOMM Records, Paladino Music, Chandos Records
- Website: kennethhesketh.co.uk

Kenneth Hesketh (born 20 July 1968) is a British composer of contemporary classical music in numerous genres including dance, orchestral, chamber, vocal and solo. He has also composed music for wind and brass bands as well as seasonal music for choir.

== Early life and education ==
Hesketh was born in Liverpool and began composing whilst a chorister at Liverpool Anglican Cathedral, completing his first work for orchestra at the age of thirteen. He received his first formal commission at nineteen for the Royal Liverpool Philharmonic Orchestra under Sir Charles Groves. He studied at the Royal College of Music, London, with Edwin Roxburgh, Joseph Horovitz and Simon Bainbridge between 1987 and 1992 and attended Tanglewood in 1995 as the Leonard Bernstein Fellow where he studied with Henri Dutilleux. After completing a master's degree in composition at the University of Michigan, Ann Arbor, USA, a series of awards followed: the Shakespeare Prize scholarship from the Toepfer Foundation, Hamburg at the behest of Sir Simon Rattle, an award from the Liverpool Foundation for Sport and the Arts, and on his return to London in 1999, Hesketh was awarded the Constant and Kit Lambert Fellowship at the Royal College of Music, with support from the Worshipful Company of Musicians.

== Musical style ==
Hesketh's work is notable for its colourful orchestration, dense harmony and a highly mobile rhythmic style.

His early work found its stimuli in extra-musical ideas. Several early works have their origins in medieval symbolism and iconography, notably three pieces for chamber ensemble: Theatrum (1996), Torturous Instruments (1997–8, after Hieronymous Bosch's depiction of Hell from The Garden of Earthly Delights), and The Circling Canopy of Night (1999). The latter of which was Hesketh's first piece to gain international attention. Commissioned by Faber Music for the Birmingham Contemporary Music Group, it was first conducted by Sir Simon Rattle and further championed by Oliver Knussen, who performed many of Hesketh's works. Performances at the Promenade Concerts at the Royal Albert Hall, London (London Sinfonietta) and the Concertgebouw, Amsterdam (ASKO Ensemble) soon followed. Described as "a glistening whirl of nocturnal colours, [with] a driving sense of purpose and onward movement", the piece was received positively.

Early works also displayed an interest in the sinister or melancholy nature of children's literature. His 2000-1 work, Netsuke (from the Japanese miniature sculptures called netsuke) – commissioned by the ensemble Endymion at the request of Hans Werner Henze – comprises five short movements inspired variously by Saint-Exupéry's Le Petit Prince, Hoffmann's Struwwelpeter, and a poem by Walter de la Mare. Other such works include Small Tales, tall tales (2009, after the Brothers Grimm), and Detail from the Record (2002, after Japanese folk tales). Including such works as Theatre of Attractions (2007) and Wunderkammer[konzert] (2008), hallmarks of his more recent style show an interest in what the composer describes as 'unreliable machines': short bursts of mechanistic material that repeat, are transformed but ultimately burn themselves out.

As an outgrowth of this, additional concepts of entropy (in humanistic terms), ageing, death, and failure in physical systems have expanded this interest in works such as Knotted Tongues (2012), Of Time and Disillusionment (2016), and In Ictu Occuli (2017). The incorporation of aspects of computer-assisted composition and limited randomised procedures has ultimately widened organisational approaches and made freer, as well as made more abstract, the ultimate musical work. This fascination with entropy, mutation and existentialism coexists with a notable interest in formal design based on the influence of 'pathways' (labyrinths and mazes) and the paradoxical notion of clarity through density.

== Career ==
From 2003 to 2005 Hesketh was New Music Fellow at Kettle's Yard and Corpus Christi College, Cambridge where he curated a series of new music chamber concerts. He was awarded The Fondation André Chevillion-Yvonne Bonnaud prize at the 2004 Concours international de piano d'Orléans after a performance of his Three Japanese Miniatures by pianist Daniel Becker. Between 2007 and 2009 he was Composer in the House (Royal Philharmonic Society/ PRS Foundation scheme) with the Royal Liverpool Philharmonic Orchestra, culminating in the premieres of Like the sea, like time as part of the celebrations for Liverpool's European Capital of Culture year, as well as Graven Image, a co-commission with the BBC Proms in 2008. Hesketh's work for dance, Forms entangled, shapes collided, commissioned by ensemble Psappha and Phoenix Dance Theatre, through the support of The Royal Philharmonic Society Drummond Fund, toured nationally throughout 2013 with final performances in the Royal Opera House, Lindbury Theatre. Commissioned and premiered in 2012 by the Seattle Symphony Orchestra under Ludovic Morlot, Knotted Tongues was performed by the Shenzhen Symphony Orchestra as part of the Beijing Modern Music Festival, China where Hesketh was a featured composer in 2014. The following year The Alchymist's Journal was selected as a test piece for the 2015 National Brass Band Championships of Great Britain. In 2017 Hesketh's In Ictu Oculi for wind orchestra won the 'Wind Band or Brass Band' category of the 2017 British Composer Awards. The panel described the winning piece "as a mature and highly imaginative work that gives the listener an ever more rewarding experience. The writing for instruments show complete mastery of the medium with continually evolving and evocative textures." Hesketh has also written extensively for pianist Clare Hammond including the piano concerto Uncoiling the River which was nominated for an Ivor Composer Award in 2019.

Hesketh has received numerous commissions from international ensembles and organisations including the Fromm Foundation at Harvard University, the Continuum Ensemble, a Faber Millennium Commission for the Birmingham Contemporary Music Group, the BBC Philharmonic, Hans Werner Henze and Endymion (in honour of Henze's 75th birthday), the Munich Biennale, the Michael Vyner Trust for the London Sinfonietta, an ENO/Almeida joint commission, Ensemble 10/10 and the Opera Group at the Linbury Theatre, Covent Garden. Performances have been given by the Frankfurt Radio Symphony Orchestra (Hessicher Rundfunk), the Sudwest Rundfunk (Baden-Baden), the London Sinfonietta, Psappha, the ASKO ensemble, the Continuum Ensemble (Spitalfields Festival), as well as featured at the Prague Premieres (Czech Philharmonic Orchestra), ISCM (Korea) and Gaudeamus Festivals. Conductors include Sir Simon Rattle, Oliver Knussen, Martyn Brabbins, Patrick Bailey, Philip Headlam, Christoph-Mathias Mueller, Vassily Sinaisky and Vasily Petrenko. Soloists include violinists Simon Blendis, Clio Gould, Peter Sheppard-Skaerved and Janet Sung, oboists Nicholas Daniel, Christopher Redgate and Hansjorg Schellenberger, sopranos Sarah Leonard, Claire Booth and Marie Vassiliou, baritone Rodney Clarke and pianists Karl Lutchmayer, Sarah Nichols and Daniel Becker.

His work has been recorded by BIS, NMC, London Sinfonietta, Psappha and Prima Facie labels; an NMC recording (titled Wunderkammer(konzert), released in 2013) was devoted to large ensemble and orchestral works. A disc of Hesketh's piano music performed by pianist Clare Hammond was released by BIS in 2016; in the same year, the Prima Facie label released a chamber music disc performed by the Continuum Ensemble. An orchestral portrait disc, Hesketh's fourth disc, was released in 2018 to great critical acclaim, and Hesketh's fifth portrait disc concentrating on music for 2 pianos and piano four hands was released by the Prima Facie label, performed by the Françoise-Green piano duo in 2019.

His many concert works, including opera, orchestral, chamber, vocal and solo works are published by either Schott & Co., London or, for more recent works, Cecilian Music. Hesketh's works for symphonic wind band are published by Faber Music. His seasonal compositions for choir and orchestra are published by Novello & Co. Hesketh is Professor of Composition and Orchestration at the Royal College of Music, honorary professor at Liverpool University and active as a guest lecturer and visiting professor. He lives in London with his wife, American composer Arlene Sierra, and their son Elliott.

== See also ==
- Kenneth Hesketh discography
