= Dorival =

Dorival may refer to:

== People ==
=== Given name ===
- Dorival Caymmi (1914–2008), Brazilian singer, songwriter, actor and artist
- Dori Caymmi (born 1943), Dorival Tostes Caymmi, Brazilian singer, songwriter and producer
- Dorival Júnior (born 1962), Brazilian football manager and former defensive midfielder
- Doriva (born 1972), Dorival Guidoni Júnior, Brazilian football manager and former midfielder
- Dorival Thomas (born 1976), Brazilian football defender
- Doriva (footballer, born 1987), Brazilian football defensive midfielder

=== Surname ===
- Géo Dorival (1879–1968), French poster artist
- Jérôme Dorival (born 1952), French clarinetist, and composer
- Dudley Dorival (born 1975), Haitian hurdler

== Other uses ==
- Dorival (brand), ibuprofen brand in the Caribbean and Latin America produced by Bayer
