= Françoise Élisabeth Desfossez =

French composer and pianist

Françoise Élisabeth Desfossez (born Françoise Élisabeth Carraque, 4 February 1743 Paris - 27 September 1825 Paris) was a French composer and pianist. She composed sonatas for the piano.

== Life ==
In 1790, three scores of sonatas for pianoforte were published in the name of Madame la comtesse DFZ, dedicated respectively to Madame la Viscountess de Ghent, to the composer and pianist Hélène de Montgeroult and to Madame Hocquart, "first president of the Court of Aydes". In 1798, Françoise Élisabeth Desfossez signed a collection of three sonatas dedicated to the composer Ignace Pleyel, her friend and her music tutor.

In 1763, she married Charles-Henri Desfossez, Count of Villeneuve, Lord of Cappy, Lieutenant-Colonel of the Dragoons and Knight of Saint-Louis at the Saint-Laurent church. She takes the title of Countess.

The couple had several children: Charles-Henri in 1764; twins who died at birth; Pierre-Antoine (or Pierre-Marin) in 1767, "mute and imbecile" by birth. In 1790, a pension of 500 livres was granted to Françoise Élisabeth Desfossez "in consideration of the services of her husband, first captain of the colonel-general, dragoons, with the rank of lieutenant-colonel; to pay, for the subsistence of their son, who has the assurance of this pension, in the event that he survives his mother,"

Françoise Élisabeth Desfossez was widowed in 1802, and died in September 1825, at her home at 12, rue Meslay, Paris. She was buried three days later in the Père-Lachaise cemetery, Shortly after, the Gazette de France wrote: "Art lovers have just lost a lady who, under the simple title of amateur, had achieved success in the composition and performance of piano music which made her the worthy rival of Mmes de Montgeront, de Puisieux and Whinn.
