= Gavorkna Fanfare =

1991 music composition by Jack Stamp

Gavorkna Fanfare was a musical composition written by Jack Stamp in 1991 for wind ensemble. The Indiana University Symphonic Band of Jacobs School of Music at Indiana University in Bloomington performed it in November 1991 for their band showcase, conducted by Michael Schaaf. The Cavaliers Drum and Bugle Corps performed it in their 1992 show. The piece was first recorded by the Keystone Winds in 1995's Past The Equinox: The Music of Jack Stamp.

== Composition ==
The introduction is characterized by a rapid cluster of ascending dissonant intervals. The exposition begins as the trumpets introduce the A theme, consisting of motoric sixteenth notes followed by an eighth note ascending three note pattern outlining a minor scale. This repeats several times in rhythmic diminution and canonic juxtaposing in different instruments. The A theme concludes with a cadential resting point, as the percussion section introduces a layered ostinato as a backdrop for the B Section fugue. The fugue theme is introduced in the horns, and answered in the trombones. Each time the theme is re-stated, it is varied using ornamentation based on the skeletal thematic material of the original fugue theme. The third entrance is in the trumpets and the final entrance is in the tubas and bass trombone. A brief chordal transition returns the listener to the recapitulated A theme, and ultimately cadences on a major triad with a prominent timpani solo echoing a final rhythmic variation of the B theme fugue.

== Selected Recordings ==
Indiana University Symphonic Band, fall 1991

- Past the Equinox: The Music of Jack Stamp.
