= John Barstow (pianist) =

English pianist

John Dennis Barstow (21 May 1937–11 October 2024) was an English pianist who taught at the Royal College of Music for 40 years.

Barstow was born in Morley, West Yorkshire and first studied piano at Leeds College of Music with Hans Solty, a pupil of Ferruccio Busoni. From 1954 - including a break for national service - he was at the Royal College of Music, studying piano with Cyril Smith and composition with Bernard Stevens. He made his Wigmore Hall debut in 1961 and for the next decade performed a wide range of repertoire, including Rachmaninoff's Second Piano Concerto under Malcolm Arnold at the Proms in 1968. In 1969 he made the first broadcast recording of John Joubert's Piano Concerto.

From the late 1960s Barstow began to focus more on teaching at the Royal College of Music, where he was appointed a Fellow in 1981, and where he continued teaching until his retirement in 2007. He also taught at the Summer School for Pianists, from 1987 (in York) to 2011 (in Hereford). His many pupils include Barry Douglas, Julian Jacobson, Nataša Lipovšek, James Lisney, Karl Lutchmayer, Neil Roxburgh, Nicholas Unwin and Katherine Wolf. He was awarded an MBE in 2006.
