= Hélène de Montgeroult =

French pianist and composer (1764–1836)

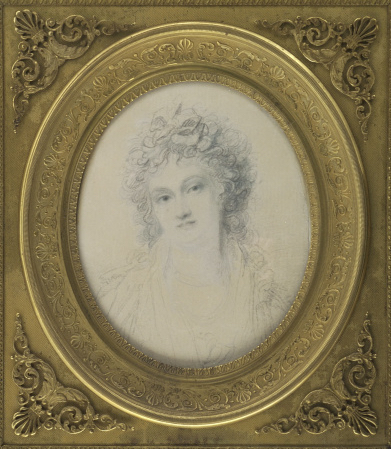
Hélène de Montgeroult by Richard Cosway c. 1786

Marquise Hélène de Montgeroult, born Hélène Antoinette Marie de Nervo, (2 March 1764 – 20 May 1836) was a French composer and pianist. Recognised as one of the best fortepiano performers and improvisers of her time, and a published composer, de Montgeroult adapted to the rapid development of her instrument by makers such as Érard. She is considered by her biographer Jérôme Dorival as a bridge between classicism and romanticism. He describes her as "the missing link between Mozart and Chopin".

== Biography ==
=== Origins ===
Hélène Antoinette Marie de Nervo was born on 2 March 1764 in Lyon into an unlanded family of recent nobility, though they did have lands in Beaujolais (inherited from J. A. Rique, Hélène's godfather), in Oingt and Theizé (the Château de Rochebonne). Her father, Jean-Baptiste de Nervo, had several roles within the judicial authorities in Lyon and had inherited his title of nobility of the first degree as an advisor to the Court of Currencies and to the seneschal and presidial courts of the Court of Lyon from his father who had bought the title. The family of Hélène's mother, Anne Marie Sabine Mayeuvre de Champvieux, had land ties to the Monts du Lyonnais (Manor of Champvieux in Saint-Germain-au-Mont-d'Or). She herself had acquired her titles of nobility a few years earlier through a charge échevinale.

Hélène spent some of her early years in Paris, where her brother Christophe Olympe de Nervo was born in 1765, and attended lessons with the great keyboard masters who stayed there in the final decades of the ancien régime. These included Nicolas-Joseph Hüllmandel, Jan Ladislav Dussek, and, perhaps, Muzio Clementi.

In 1784 Hélène married her first husband, the Marquis André Marie Gautier de Montgeroult, thereby becoming the Marquise de Montgeroult. During the final years of the ancien régime, she performed in many of the celebrated Parisian salons, including those of Madame Vigée-Lebrun, the Rochechouart family, Madame de Staël and Madame de Genlis. In November 1785, Hélène met violinist Giovanni Battista Viotti with whom she developed an artistic friendship. She also gave piano lessons to the young Johann Baptist Cramer at this time.

=== Early years of the French Revolution ===
During the early years of the French Revolution, the Marquis and Marquise associated with moderate revolutionaries, who supported the establishment of a constitutional monarchy, as well as certain significant political figures of the time (notably Bailly). In particular, they attended the Society of Friends of the Constitution from its inception, and the Feuillants Club.

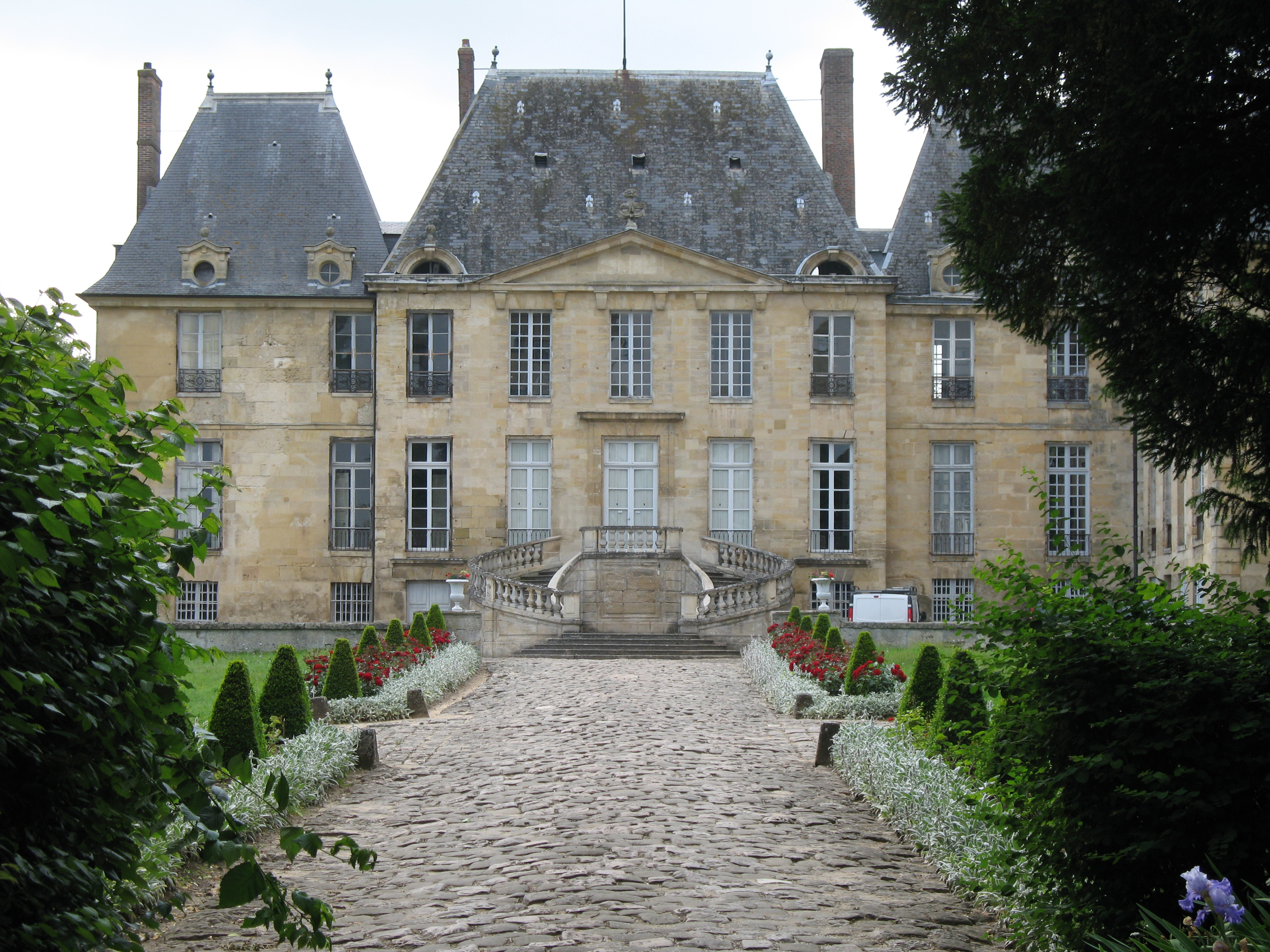
Château de Montgeroult

Hélène de Montgeroult participated in the musical programme at the Théâtre of Monsieur, then at the Théâtre Feydeau directed by Viotti. In 1791, following the performance of The Two Nicodemus in the Plain of Jupiter at the theatre on the Rue Feydeau, the Marquise found herself involved in a dispute with Viotti against several political newspapers during which she was dubbed a "shameful harpsichordist".

During these years, she lived at the family château in the village of Montgeroult, in several country residencies at Montmorency and in a house on the Rue du Faubourg-Saint-Honoré in Paris. Madame de Montgeroult finally left France for London in July 1792 with her husband and Hugues-Bernard Maret before returning to Paris in December of the same year due to measures following the adoption of laws confiscating the property of emigrants.

=== Maret-Semonville diplomatic mission ===
In July 1793, the Marquis and Marquise accompanied Maret, recently named Ambassador to Naples, on the journey that was to take him to his new post. They were joined en route by Charles-Louis Huguet de Sémonville, who was himself appointed Ambassador to the Ottoman Porte, his wife and their escort. While crossing Piedmont, they were stopped by Austrians at Novate Mezzola. The men of the expedition (including the Marquis of Montgeroult) were transported to the other side of the Lake Mezzola, imprisoned for 10 days at the prison of Gravedona, then held at the palace of the Dukes of Mantua. The Marquis died there on 2 September 1793 at 57 years of age.

During the arrest, some of the women and children were beaten with rifle butts and held at gunpoint, and the expedition was looted. Hélène de Montgeroult, Madame de Sémonville and the remaining women and children were left in a situation of great distress. They managed to find shelter in Vico Soprano where they attempted to obtain the support of their relations in Venice (François Noël), Genoa, Milan (the Count Alberto de Litta) and Florence. These efforts were in vain as their letters were seized by the Venetian intercept service and never reached their destination.

Eventually, de Montgeroult managed to find protection with François de Bathélémy, Minister of France in Baden, where she also found Viotti. She remained there until 23 October 1793.

=== Under the Terror ===
While the Marquise and Marquis de Montgeroult were detained far from France, a letter of denunciation describing their behaviour and listing some of their possessions was sent on 1 August 1793 to the Jacobins of Paris. In the words of Citizen Arlain, its author, "All of these people are only patriots when they either fear or need the Nation." During the Reign of Terror on 14 September, their home was searched.

In April 1794, a decree banned certain categories of people, including nobles and foreigners, from entering Paris and other large cities. However, the Committee of Public Safety carried out several thousand requisitions to allow certain nobles judged to be of use to the Republic to escape exile in the provinces. The register of requisitions cites the Marquise of Montgeroult as "Citizen Gaultier-Montgeroult, artist, whose husband was cowardly murdered by the Austrians, to use her talent for patriotic celebrations". The Marquise was therefore permitted to stay in Paris.

The story of de Montgeroult's escape from the guillotine, where she performed an improvisation on the fortepiano based on "La Marseillaise" in front of the Revolutionary Tribunal, first appeared in the second half of the 19th century, recounted by Eugène Gautier and four other sources, with some variations. The lack of previous written references to this episode, as well as its absence in the archives of the revolutionary tribunal, have led specialists to doubt the reality of this story after the publication of J. Dorival's book. However, its veracity has never been disproved, either in the 19th or 20th century. On the other hand, Eugène Gaultier did embellish it.

It seems that de Montgeroult lost much of her fortune during these troubled years. However, the money earned through a series of successful concerts in England at this time allowed her to acquire the Château de la Salle located in the canton of Senonches in 1794.

=== Mother and teacher ===
On 11 February 1795, de Montgeroult's only child was born: Aimé Charles His, known as Horace His de la Salle (1795–1878). His father, Charles Antoine-Hyacinthe His (1769–1851), one of the editors of Le Moniteur Universel, acknowledged the child through his marriage with Hélène de Montgeroult on 1 June 1797 (12 Prairial, Year V).

On 3 August 1795 (16 Thermidor, Year III), the Law Concerning the Establishment of a Conservatoire of Music in Paris for the Teaching of this Art was announced and stated that the institution was looking for six harpsichord teachers. After passing the competition, de Montgeroult was appointed a first-class teacher of the men's piano class on 22 November 1795, by order of appointment on 1 Frimaire, Year IV. Moreover, she was also the only woman appointed as a first-class teacher during this period. Among the other first-class teachers were several famous instrumentalists of the time including Pierre Rode and Pierre Gaviniès. For this position, de Montgeroult's annual salary was fixed at 2,500 francs, equal to her male colleagues. Marcel Vilcosqui questions the reasons for her appointment and suggests that it was due to her "membership of the Freemasonry" (which has not been proved in de Montgeroult's case).

After two and a half years teaching in the heart of this institution, de Montgeroult resigned on 22 January 1798 (3 Pluviôse, Year VI), citing health concerns, to the great regret of those in charge of the Conservatoire.

=== Composer ===
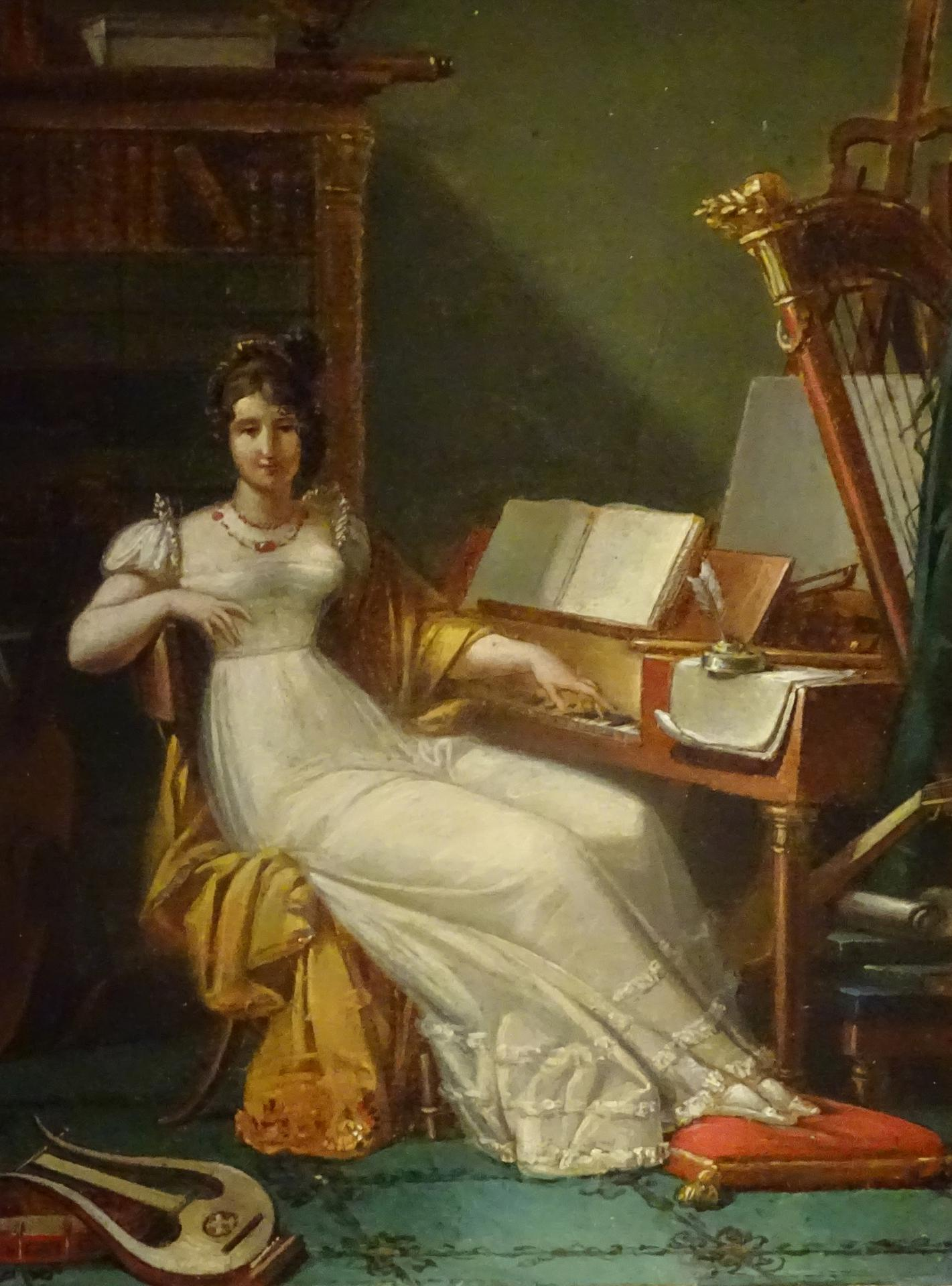
Presumed portrait of de Montgeroult

In 1795, the de Montgeroult published her 3 Sonatas, Op. 1.

During the years of the Consulate and the Empire, de Montgeroult continued to compose and publish her works for keyboard. In 1800 she published Three Sonatas, Op. 2, with Troupenas in Paris, then her Pièce pour piano, Op. 3, on 25 August 1804. Her Opp. 4 and 5, Trois Fantaisies (now lost) and Trois sonates were published between 1804 and 1807. The latter year also saw the publication of her 6 Nocturnes, Op. 6. Finally, in the early 1810s, her ostensibly didactic Complete Method was composed and engraved. This Cours complet pour l'enseignement du fortpiano comprenant 114 études had a significant impact on great names among musicians of the next generation, such as Marmontel..

In addition to composition, de Montgeroult continued to share her art in her salon where she brought friends together under the banner of "Madame de Montgeroult's Mondays". This was an opportunity for her to bring close friends together (such as Maret, Prony or Girodet) and to play with musicians of her era such as Alexandre Boucher, Viotti, Baillot, Cherubini and Kreutzer. Benjamin Constant was able to hear de Montgeroult play here on the evening of 5 June 1814.

During this period, de Montgeroult fell in love with the Baron Louis de Trémont, whom she had met in 1798.

=== Under the Restoration and the July Monarchy ===
De Montgeroult married the Count Édouard Dunod de Charnage, 19 years her junior, on 19 January 1820. This was also the year her Cours complet pour l'enseignement du fortepiano was published, though it had been completed several years earlier. This volume is, moreover, her last published work, though she continued to host her musical salon in which Ignaz Moscheles played until 1820.

In 1826 de Montgeroult was once again widowed after a fatal accident befell the count. During this period, her health started to decline so badly that she left Paris 1834 to settle with her son in Italy: first in Padua, then Pisa, and finally in Florence. She died there on 20 May 1836 and was buried in the cloisters of the Basilica Santa-Croce.

== Legacy ==
Montgeroult's influence on 19th-century Romantic composers is difficult to assess. It has not been proved Chopin and Schumann knew Montgeroult's Complete Method for Teaching Fortepiano. However, it has been suggested that elements in those composers' piano music that have long been taken as evidence of their originality can be found in the etudes of the Complete Method.

In 2006, when Jérôme Dorival published his biography of the composer, she was little known, although she had been mentioned in the second edition of the New Grove Dictionary and there had been some academic research on her. Several recordings were issued after 2006. When Montgeroult's life and musical works were reviewed on the BBC Radio 3 series Composer of the Week on 11–15 July 2022, the programme's regular presenter, Donald Macleod supplemented commercial recordings with some specially commissioned ones. He also interviewed the pianist Clare Hammond, who explained how she had explored Montgeroult's music on modern instruments after meeting Jérôme Dorival in 2019.

== Published works ==
- Trois sonatas pour le forte-piano, Op. 1 (Paris, 1795)
- Trois sonatas pour le forte-piano (avec accompagnement de violon pour le 3e Sonate), Op. 2 (Paris, 1800; surviving edition 1803)
- Pièce pour le forte piano, Op. 3 (Paris, 1804)
- Fantaisies, nos. 1, 2, 3 [Op. 4?] (Paris, [1810?])
- Trois sonatas pour le forte-piano, Op. 5 (Paris, 1811)
- Six nocturnes à voix seule avec accompagnement de piano-forte, Op. 6 (Paris, [by 1807]
- Cours complet pour l'enseignement du forte-piano, 3 vols (Paris, 1820). Contains 972 exercises and 114 études

== Selected recordings ==
- Hélène de Montgeroult, La Marquise et la Marseillaise, Éditions Hortus (CD, 2008).
- Hélène de Montgeroult: A la source du piano romantique (Études nos. 97, 110, etc. played by Nicolas Stavy). Hortus (CD, 2009).
- Hélène de Montgeroult, piano music played by Edna Stern on a Pleyel instrument dated 1860. Orchid Classics (CD, 2017).
- Hélène de Montgeroult : The Complete Piano Sonatas played by Nicolas Horvath on a Steinway. Naxos – Grand Piano Records (2CD, 2021).
- Hélène de Montgeroult – 29 Études from Cours complet pour l'enseignement du forte-piano played by Clare Hammond on a Steinway. BIS Records BIS2603 (CD, 2022).
