= Clare Hammond =

British concert pianist

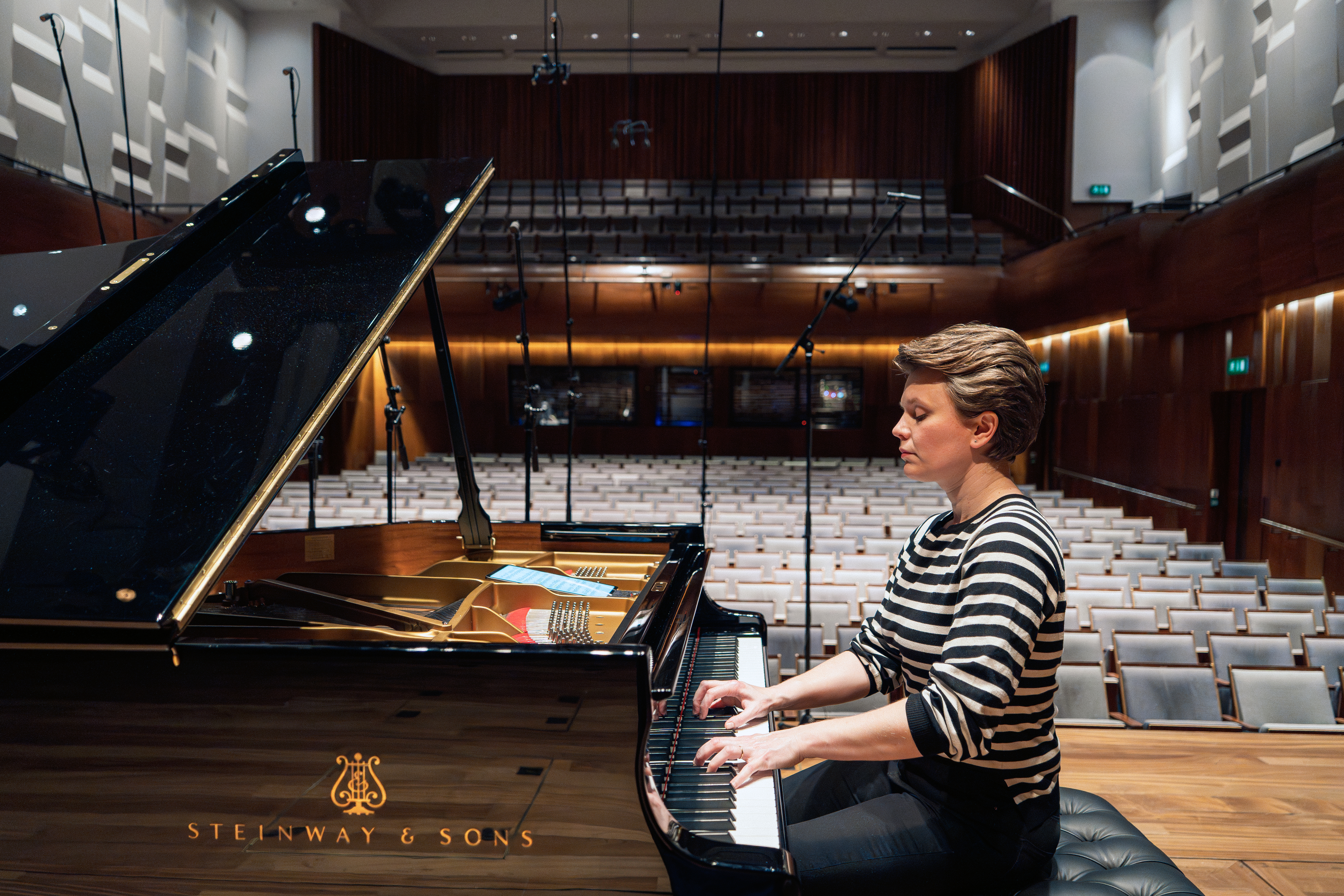
Hammond in 2025.

Clare Hammond (born 1985) is a British concert pianist. In 2016, she was awarded the Royal Philharmonic Society's Young Artist award and in 2024 an Edison Klassiek Award.

== Early life and education ==
Hammond grew up in Nottingham, was educated at Nottingham Girls' High School and studied at Emmanuel College, Cambridge, where she achieved a double first in music. She then undertook postgraduate study with Ronan O'Hora at the Guildhall School of Music and Drama. She has also completed a DMA at London's City University, writing her thesis on 20th-century left-hand piano concertos commissioned by pianist Paul Wittgenstein.

== Performance career ==
Hammond has performed in concert halls and at festivals across Europe, and is regularly broadcast on BBC Radio 3 and other European radio networks. She made her BBC Proms debut in 2024 and has appeared as a concerto soloist with the Philharmonia, London Philharmonic Orchestra, BBC Symphony Orchestra, Britten Sinfonia, BBC National Orchestra of Wales, BBC Philharmonic, BBC Concert Orchestra, City of Birmingham Symphony Orchestra, Royal Philharmonic Orchestra, Royal Liverpool Philharmonic Orchestra, Ulster Orchestra, Bournemouth Symphony Orchestra, Warsaw Philharmonic, NFM Wrocław Philharmonic and Swedish Chamber Orchestra. Hammond has given solo recitals at the Wigmore Hall, Aldeburgh Festival, Klavier-Festival Ruhr, Salle Bourgie, Konzerthaus Berlin and Fundación Juan March, and has collaborated with artists including the Carducci, Brodsky, Endellion, and Badke quartets, and Henning Kraggerud, Andrew Kennedy, Jennifer Pike, and Lawrence Power.

In 2016, Hammond was awarded the Royal Philharmonic Society's Young Artist award and in 2024 an Edison Klassiek Award.

An advocate of contemporary music, Hammond has given world premieres of works by composers such as Ninfea Cruttwell-Reade, Edmund Finnis, Benjamin Attahir, Rockey Sun Keting, Graham Fitkin, Michael Berkeley, George Stevenson, Robert Saxton, Kenneth Hesketh, Edwin Roxburgh and Arlene Sierra. She has led projects to revive the music of forgotten composers, recording the entirety of Josef Myslivecek's keyboard works in 2018 and a disc of etudes by Hélène de Montgeroult in 2021. In 2018 she developed Ghosts and Whispers, for piano and film, in collaboration with animators the Quay Brothers and composer John Woolrich, which has been performed at the Barbican in London and Fundación Juan March in Madrid.

Hammond has a strong interest in Polish music and culture and co-curated a centenary festival for Andrzej Panufnik at King's Place in London. She has toured Poland on multiple occasions, and performed at the Chopin and his Europe Festival in Warsaw in 2014.

In 2024, Hammond founded the Gloucestershire Piano Trust to bring live classical music to schools and prisons and ran a co-creation project with composer Michael Betteridge to write pieces for solo piano with prisoners.

== Film work ==
In 2015 Hammond appeared as the young Miss Shepherd in the film adaptation of The Lady in the Van by Alan Bennett and recorded the film's soundtrack with George Fenton, the Philharmonia, and the BBC Concert Orchestra.

She was involved as a piano teacher in the 2011 film Hysteria and was Felicity Jones's hand double.

== Discography ==
Hammond has released a number of recordings:

- Piano Concertos by Tippett, Walton and Britten (BIS Records, 2025)
- Grace Williams: Sinfonia Concertante (Lyrita, 2025)
- Andrzej Panufnik: Fantasia (RecArt, 2024)
- Kenneth Hesketh: Hände – Music for Piano (Paladino Music, 2024)
- Michael Berkeley: Collaborations (Orchid Classics, 2024)
- Graham Fitkin: Loosening (Signum Records, 2024)
- Edmund Finnis: Youth (Pentatone, 2024)
- Hélène de Montgeroult: Etudes (BIS Records, 2022)
- Adam Gorb: Piano Music (Toccata Classics, 2022)
- Variations – a programme of twentieth and twenty-first century variations for piano (BIS Records, 2021)
- Josef Mysliveček: Complete Music for Keyboard – with the Swedish Chamber Orchestra and Nicholas McGegan (BIS Records, 2019)
- Roman Palester: Concertinos – with Sinfonia Iuventus and Łukasz Borowicz (PWM, 2019)
- Robert Saxton: Piano Music (Toccata Classics, 2018)
- Art of Dancing – music for piano and trumpet, with Simon Desbruslais (Signum Records, 2017)
- Horae (pro clara) – solo piano music by Ken Hesketh (BIS Records, 2016)
- The Lady In The Van soundtrack (Sony, 2015)
- Etude – 20th and 21st-century etudes by Unsuk Chin, Karol Szymanowski, Sergei Lyapunov and Nikolai Kapustin (BIS Records, 2015)
- Reflections – piano works by Andrzej and Roxanna Panufnik (BIS Records, 2014)
- Piano Polyptych – piano works by contemporary British composers (Prima Facie Records, 2012)
