= Prairial (ship) =

The following ships are named for Prairial:

- Prairial (supertanker), one of the Batillus-class supertankers
- French submarine Prairial of the French Navy, sunk in a collision in April 1918.
- French frigate Prairial, a frigate of the French Navy
