= John Byers =

John Byers may refer to:

- John Byers (architect) (1872–1966), Southern Californian architect and builder noted for use of the Spanish Colonial Revival style
- John Fitzgerald Byers, usually known just as "Byers", a fictional character in The X-Files

== See also ==
- John Byer (1903–1988), Barbadian cricketer
- Jonathan Byers (disambiguation)
