= Enescu =

Enescu is a Romanian surname. Notable people with the surname include:

- Adrian Enescu (1948–2016), Romanian composer
- Andrei Enescu (born 1987), Romanian footballer
- George Enescu (1881–1955), Romanian classical violinist, pianist and composer
- Nicolae Enescu (1911–1993), Romanian politician

== See also ==
- Enescu Prize, Romanian prize in music composition
