= Prairial =

9th month in the French Republican calendar

Prairial (French pronunciation: [pʁɛʁjal]) was the ninth month in the French Republican calendar. This month was named after the French word prairie 'meadow'. It was the name given to several ships.

Prairial was the third month of the spring quarter (mois de printemps). It started May 20 or May 21. It ended June 18 or June 19. It follows Floréal and precedes Messidor.

Year: 3
Month: Prairial
Year: III

Day of the 10-day
week (décade)
Primidi
Duodi
Tridi
Quartidi
Quintidi
Sextidi
Septidi
Octidi
Nonidi
Décadi

décade 25
1	Wednesday; 20 May 1795
2	Thursday; 21 May 1795
3	Friday; 22 May 1795
4	Saturday; 23 May 1795
5	Sunday; 24 May 1795
6	Monday; 25 May 1795
7	Tuesday; 26 May 1795
8	Wednesday; 27 May 1795
9	Thursday; 28 May 1795
10	Friday; 29 May 1795

décade 26
11	Saturday; 30 May 1795
12	Sunday; 31 May 1795
13	Monday; 1 June 1795
14	Tuesday; 2 June 1795
15	Wednesday; 3 June 1795
16	Thursday; 4 June 1795
17	Friday; 5 June 1795
18	Saturday; 6 June 1795
19	Sunday; 7 June 1795
20	Monday; 8 June 1795

décade 27
21	Tuesday; 9 June 1795
22	Wednesday; 10 June 1795
23	Thursday; 11 June 1795
24	Friday; 12 June 1795
25	Saturday; 13 June 1795
26	Sunday; 14 June 1795
27	Monday; 15 June 1795
28	Tuesday; 16 June 1795
29	Wednesday; 17 June 1795
30	Thursday; 18 June 1795

Decimal time – 10 h/day
Paris
0h92m51s

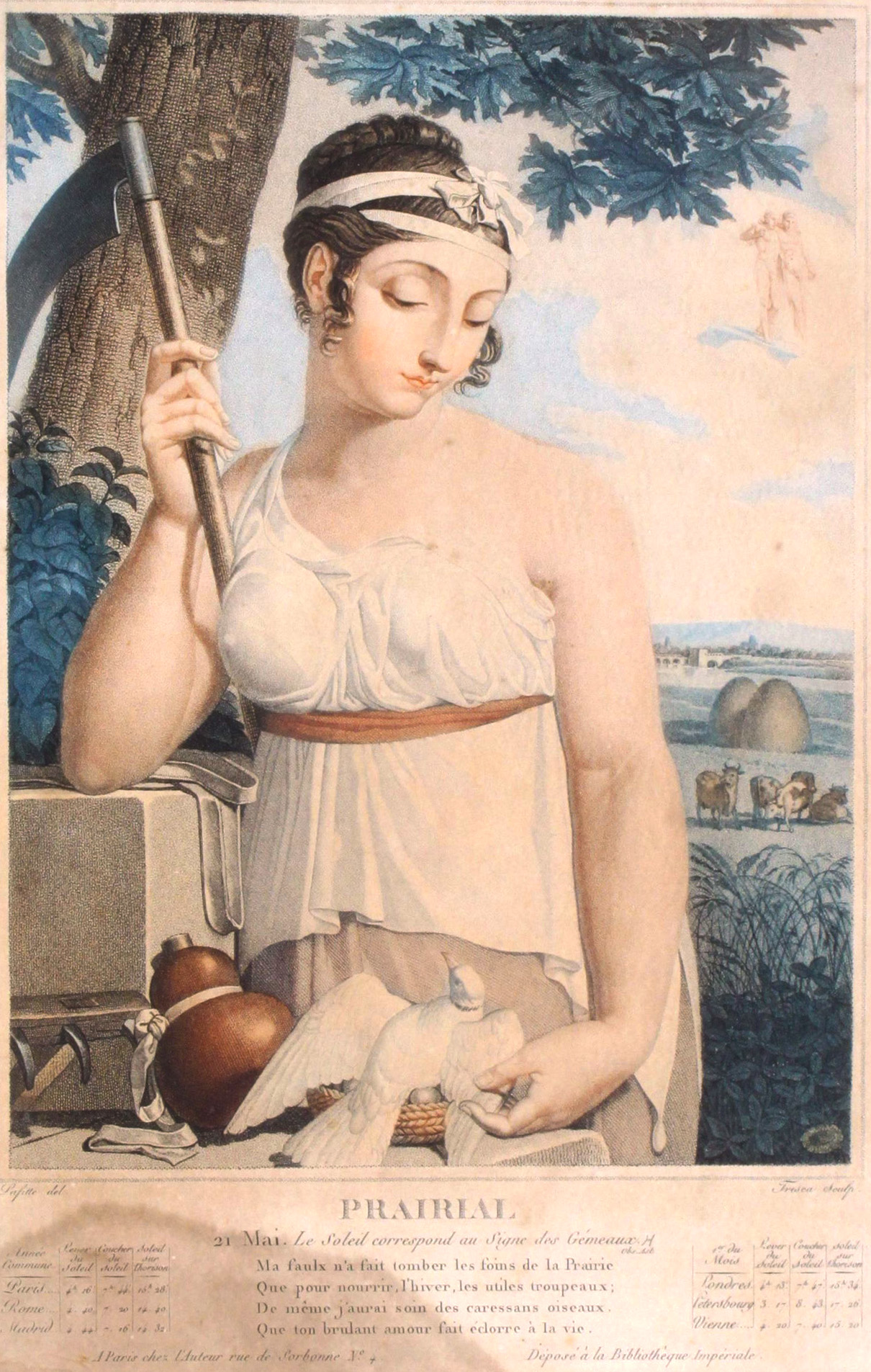
Prairial

02:03:52
Time of day - 24 h/day
Greenwich

Conversion between Republican and Gregorian calendar for the years I - XIV

Year: 1
Month: Prairial
Year: I

Day of the 10-day
week (décade)
Primidi
Duodi
Tridi
Quartidi
Quintidi
Sextidi
Septidi
Octidi
Nonidi
Décadi

décade 25
1	Monday; 20 May 1793
2	Tuesday; 21 May 1793
3	Wednesday; 22 May 1793
4	Thursday; 23 May 1793
5	Friday; 24 May 1793
6	Saturday; 25 May 1793
7	Sunday; 26 May 1793
8	Monday; 27 May 1793
9	Tuesday; 28 May 1793
10	Wednesday; 29 May 1793

décade 26
11	Thursday; 30 May 1793
12	Friday; 31 May 1793
13	Saturday; 1 June 1793
14	Sunday; 2 June 1793
15	Monday; 3 June 1793
16	Tuesday; 4 June 1793
17	Wednesday; 5 June 1793
18	Thursday; 6 June 1793
19	Friday; 7 June 1793
20	Saturday; 8 June 1793

décade 27
21	Sunday; 9 June 1793
22	Monday; 10 June 1793
23	Tuesday; 11 June 1793
24	Wednesday; 12 June 1793
25	Thursday; 13 June 1793
26	Friday; 14 June 1793
27	Saturday; 15 June 1793
28	Sunday; 16 June 1793
29	Monday; 17 June 1793
30	Tuesday; 18 June 1793

Decimal time – 10 h/day
Paris
0:86:01

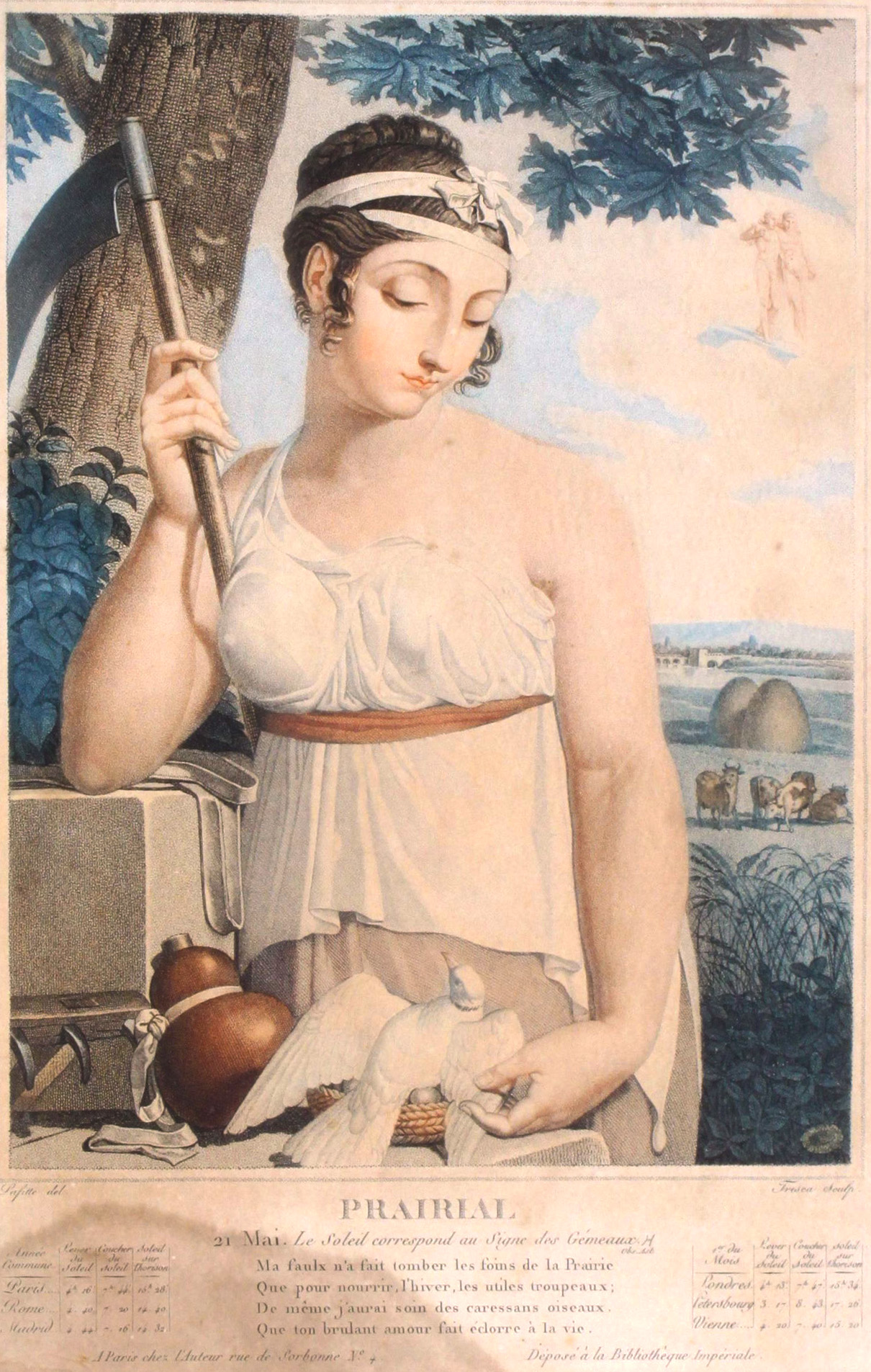
Prairial

02:03:52
Time of day - 24 h/day
Greenwich

Year: 2
Month: Prairial
Year: II

Day of the 10-day
week (décade)
Primidi
Duodi
Tridi
Quartidi
Quintidi
Sextidi
Septidi
Octidi
Nonidi
Décadi

décade 25
1	Tuesday; 20 May 1794
2	Wednesday; 21 May 1794
3	Thursday; 22 May 1794
4	Friday; 23 May 1794
5	Saturday; 24 May 1794
6	Sunday; 25 May 1794
7	Monday; 26 May 1794
8	Tuesday; 27 May 1794
9	Wednesday; 28 May 1794
10	Thursday; 29 May 1794

décade 26
11	Friday; 30 May 1794
12	Saturday; 31 May 1794
13	Sunday; 1 June 1794
14	Monday; 2 June 1794
15	Tuesday; 3 June 1794
16	Wednesday; 4 June 1794
17	Thursday; 5 June 1794
18	Friday; 6 June 1794
19	Saturday; 7 June 1794
20	Sunday; 8 June 1794

décade 27
21	Monday; 9 June 1794
22	Tuesday; 10 June 1794
23	Wednesday; 11 June 1794
24	Thursday; 12 June 1794
25	Friday; 13 June 1794
26	Saturday; 14 June 1794
27	Sunday; 15 June 1794
28	Monday; 16 June 1794
29	Tuesday; 17 June 1794
30	Wednesday; 18 June 1794

Decimal time – 10 h/day
Paris
0:86:01

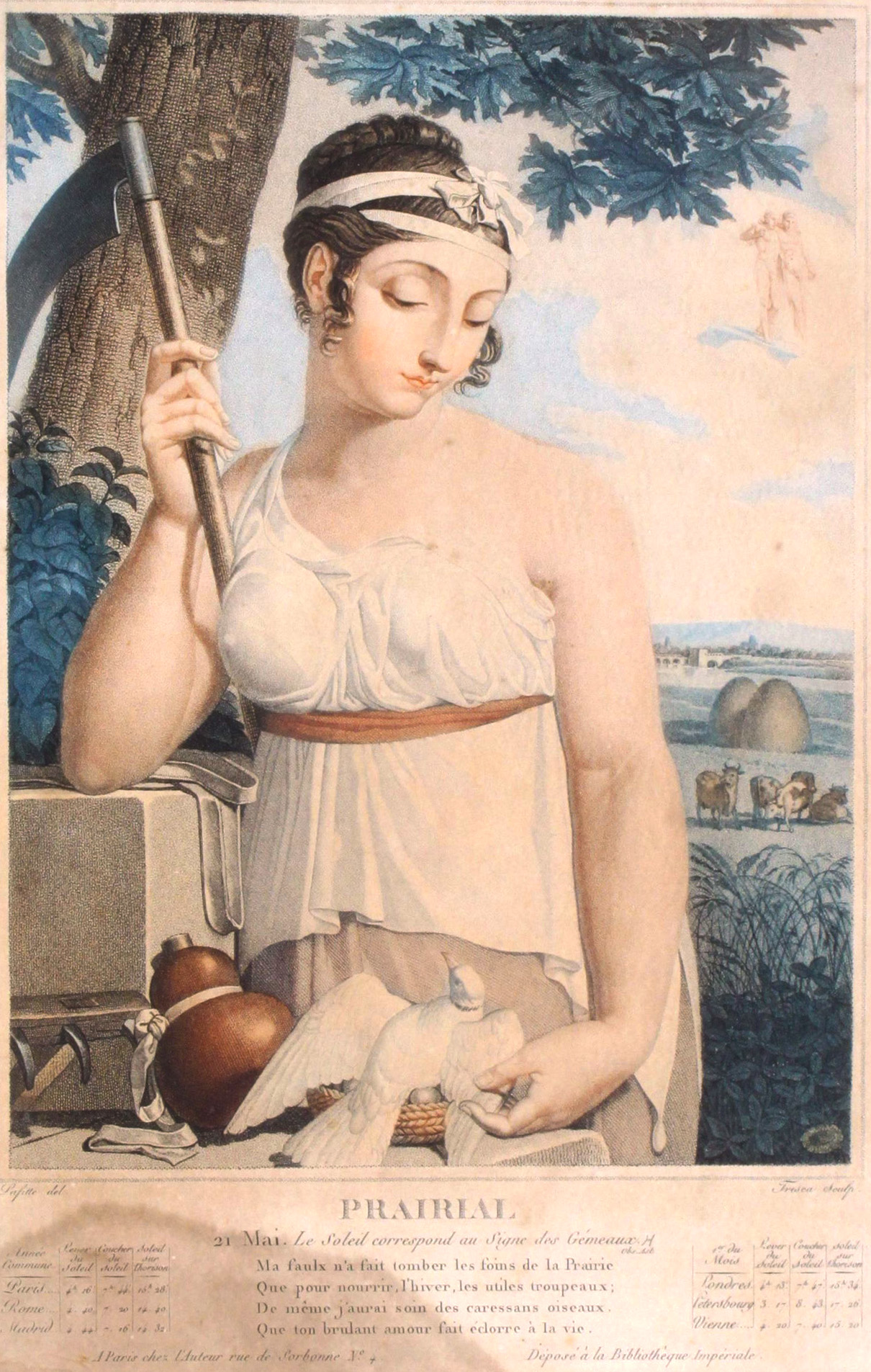
Prairial

02:03:52
Time of day - 24 h/day
Greenwich

Year: 3
Month: Prairial
Year: III

Day of the 10-day
week (décade)
Primidi
Duodi
Tridi
Quartidi
Quintidi
Sextidi
Septidi
Octidi
Nonidi
Décadi

décade 25
1	Wednesday; 20 May 1795
2	Thursday; 21 May 1795
3	Friday; 22 May 1795
4	Saturday; 23 May 1795
5	Sunday; 24 May 1795
6	Monday; 25 May 1795
7	Tuesday; 26 May 1795
8	Wednesday; 27 May 1795
9	Thursday; 28 May 1795
10	Friday; 29 May 1795

décade 26
11	Saturday; 30 May 1795
12	Sunday; 31 May 1795
13	Monday; 1 June 1795
14	Tuesday; 2 June 1795
15	Wednesday; 3 June 1795
16	Thursday; 4 June 1795
17	Friday; 5 June 1795
18	Saturday; 6 June 1795
19	Sunday; 7 June 1795
20	Monday; 8 June 1795

décade 27
21	Tuesday; 9 June 1795
22	Wednesday; 10 June 1795
23	Thursday; 11 June 1795
24	Friday; 12 June 1795
25	Saturday; 13 June 1795
26	Sunday; 14 June 1795
27	Monday; 15 June 1795
28	Tuesday; 16 June 1795
29	Wednesday; 17 June 1795
30	Thursday; 18 June 1795

Decimal time – 10 h/day
Paris
0:86:01

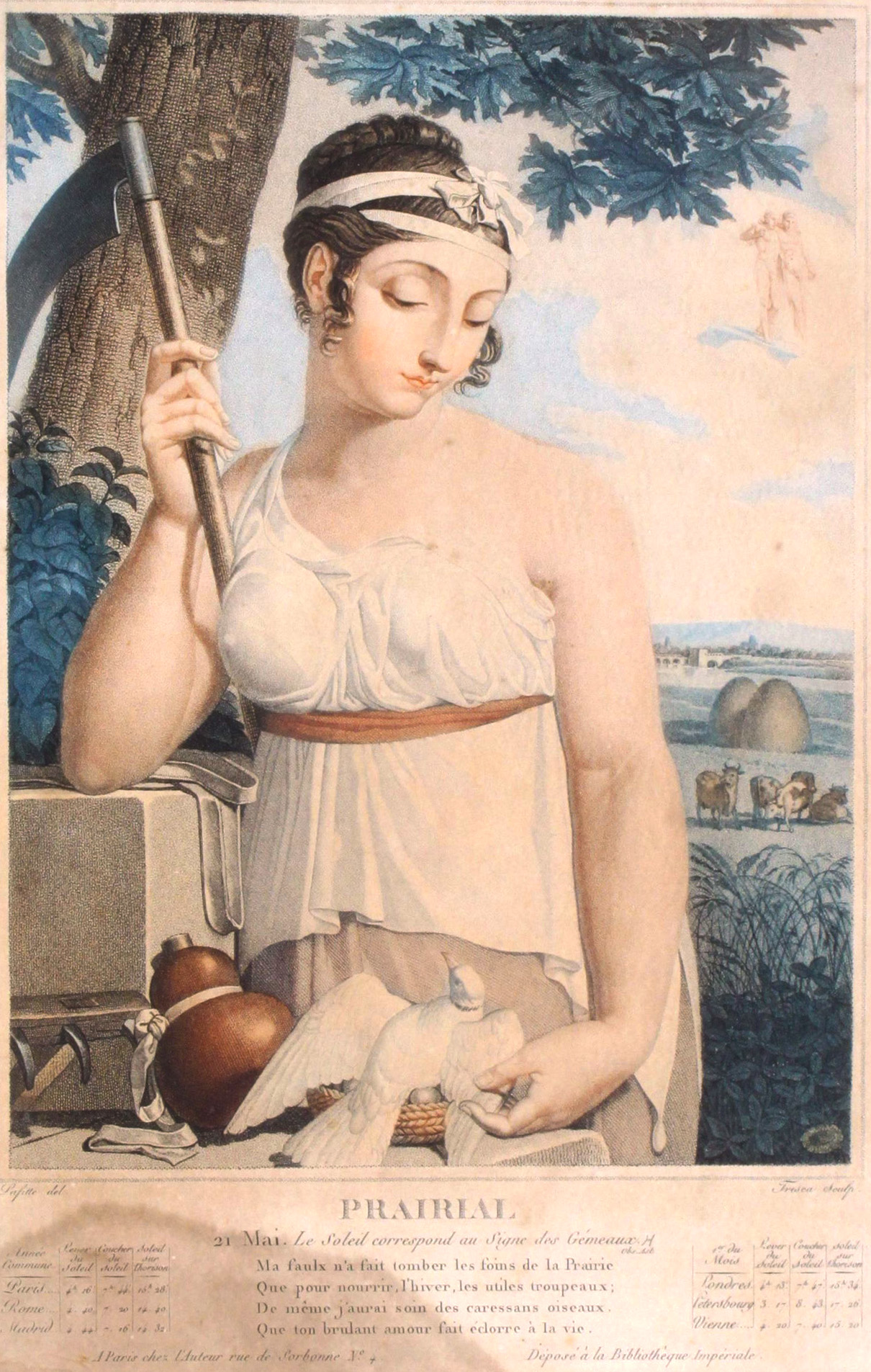
Prairial

02:03:52
Time of day - 24 h/day
Greenwich

Year: 4
Month: Prairial
Year: IV

Day of the 10-day
week (décade)
Primidi
Duodi
Tridi
Quartidi
Quintidi
Sextidi
Septidi
Octidi
Nonidi
Décadi

décade 25
1	Friday; 20 May 1796
2	Saturday; 21 May 1796
3	Sunday; 22 May 1796
4	Monday; 23 May 1796
5	Tuesday; 24 May 1796
6	Wednesday; 25 May 1796
7	Thursday; 26 May 1796
8	Friday; 27 May 1796
9	Saturday; 28 May 1796
10	Sunday; 29 May 1796

décade 26
11	Monday; 30 May 1796
12	Tuesday; 31 May 1796
13	Wednesday; 1 June 1796
14	Thursday; 2 June 1796
15	Friday; 3 June 1796
16	Saturday; 4 June 1796
17	Sunday; 5 June 1796
18	Monday; 6 June 1796
19	Tuesday; 7 June 1796
20	Wednesday; 8 June 1796

décade 27
21	Thursday; 9 June 1796
22	Friday; 10 June 1796
23	Saturday; 11 June 1796
24	Sunday; 12 June 1796
25	Monday; 13 June 1796
26	Tuesday; 14 June 1796
27	Wednesday; 15 June 1796
28	Thursday; 16 June 1796
29	Friday; 17 June 1796
30	Saturday; 18 June 1796

Decimal time – 10 h/day
Paris
0:86:01

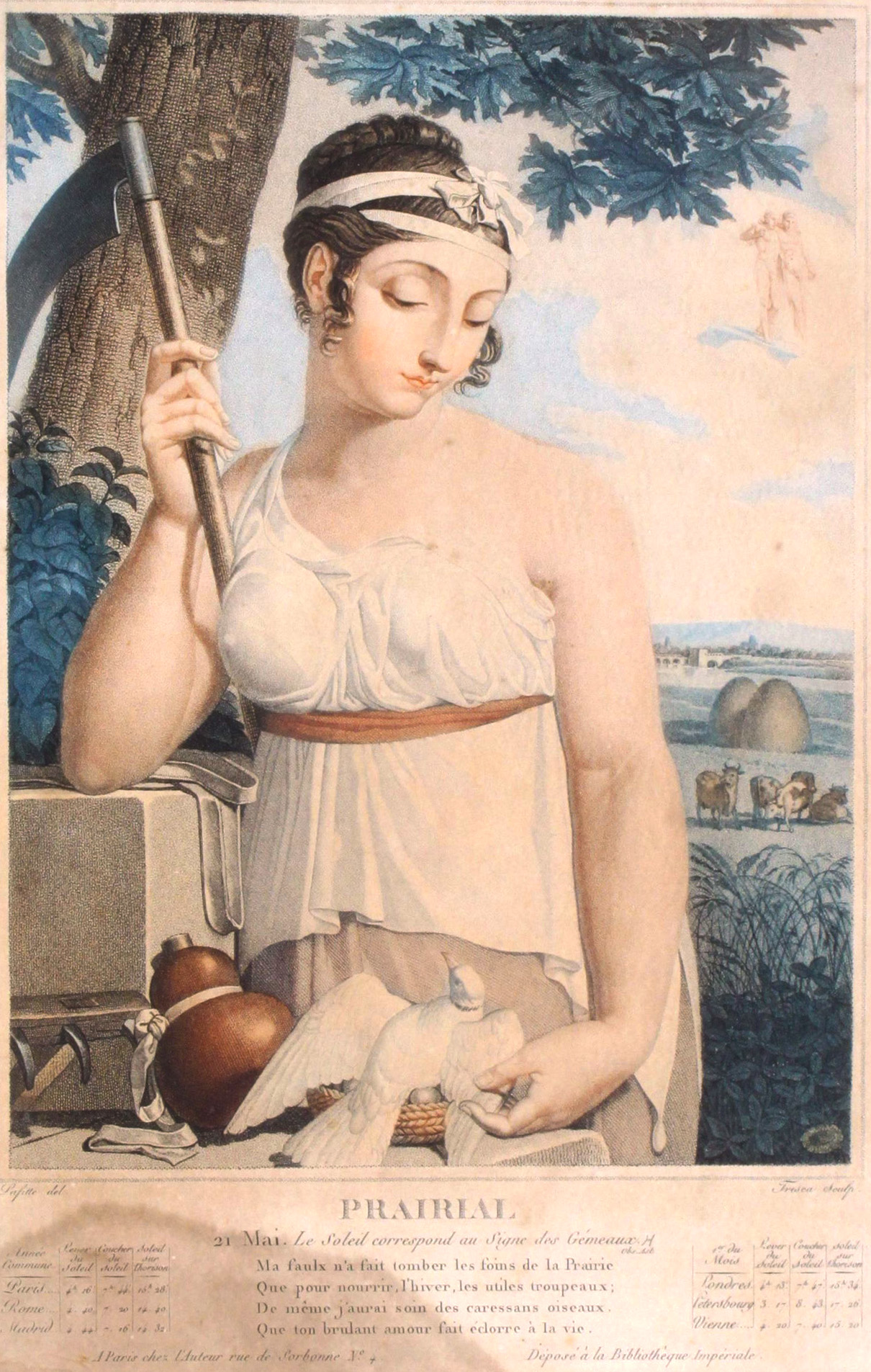
Prairial

02:03:52
Time of day - 24 h/day
Greenwich

Year: 5
Month: Prairial
Year: V

Day of the 10-day
week (décade)
Primidi
Duodi
Tridi
Quartidi
Quintidi
Sextidi
Septidi
Octidi
Nonidi
Décadi

décade 25
1	Saturday; 20 May 1797
2	Sunday; 21 May 1797
3	Monday; 22 May 1797
4	Tuesday; 23 May 1797
5	Wednesday; 24 May 1797
6	Thursday; 25 May 1797
7	Friday; 26 May 1797
8	Saturday; 27 May 1797
9	Sunday; 28 May 1797
10	Monday; 29 May 1797

décade 26
11	Tuesday; 30 May 1797
12	Wednesday; 31 May 1797
13	Thursday; 1 June 1797
14	Friday; 2 June 1797
15	Saturday; 3 June 1797
16	Sunday; 4 June 1797
17	Monday; 5 June 1797
18	Tuesday; 6 June 1797
19	Wednesday; 7 June 1797
20	Thursday; 8 June 1797

décade 27
21	Friday; 9 June 1797
22	Saturday; 10 June 1797
23	Sunday; 11 June 1797
24	Monday; 12 June 1797
25	Tuesday; 13 June 1797
26	Wednesday; 14 June 1797
27	Thursday; 15 June 1797
28	Friday; 16 June 1797
29	Saturday; 17 June 1797
30	Sunday; 18 June 1797

Decimal time – 10 h/day
Paris
0:86:01

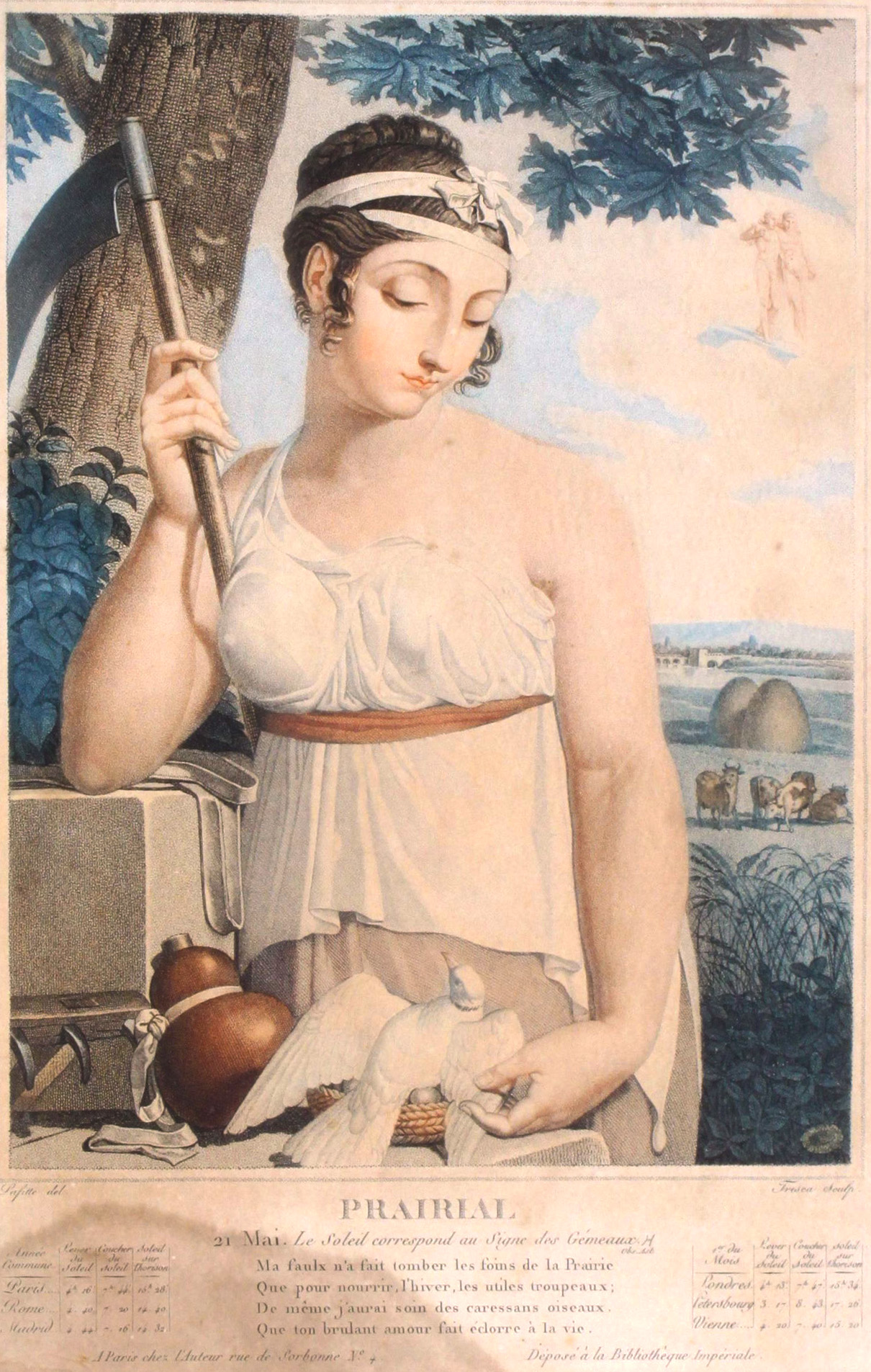
Prairial

02:03:52
Time of day - 24 h/day
Greenwich

Year: 6
Month: Prairial
Year: VI

Day of the 10-day
week (décade)
Primidi
Duodi
Tridi
Quartidi
Quintidi
Sextidi
Septidi
Octidi
Nonidi
Décadi

décade 25
1	Sunday; 20 May 1798
2	Monday; 21 May 1798
3	Tuesday; 22 May 1798
4	Wednesday; 23 May 1798
5	Thursday; 24 May 1798
6	Friday; 25 May 1798
7	Saturday; 26 May 1798
8	Sunday; 27 May 1798
9	Monday; 28 May 1798
10	Tuesday; 29 May 1798

décade 26
11	Wednesday; 30 May 1798
12	Thursday; 31 May 1798
13	Friday; 1 June 1798
14	Saturday; 2 June 1798
15	Sunday; 3 June 1798
16	Monday; 4 June 1798
17	Tuesday; 5 June 1798
18	Wednesday; 6 June 1798
19	Thursday; 7 June 1798
20	Friday; 8 June 1798

décade 27
21	Saturday; 9 June 1798
22	Sunday; 10 June 1798
23	Monday; 11 June 1798
24	Tuesday; 12 June 1798
25	Wednesday; 13 June 1798
26	Thursday; 14 June 1798
27	Friday; 15 June 1798
28	Saturday; 16 June 1798
29	Sunday; 17 June 1798
30	Monday; 18 June 1798

Decimal time – 10 h/day
Paris
0:86:01

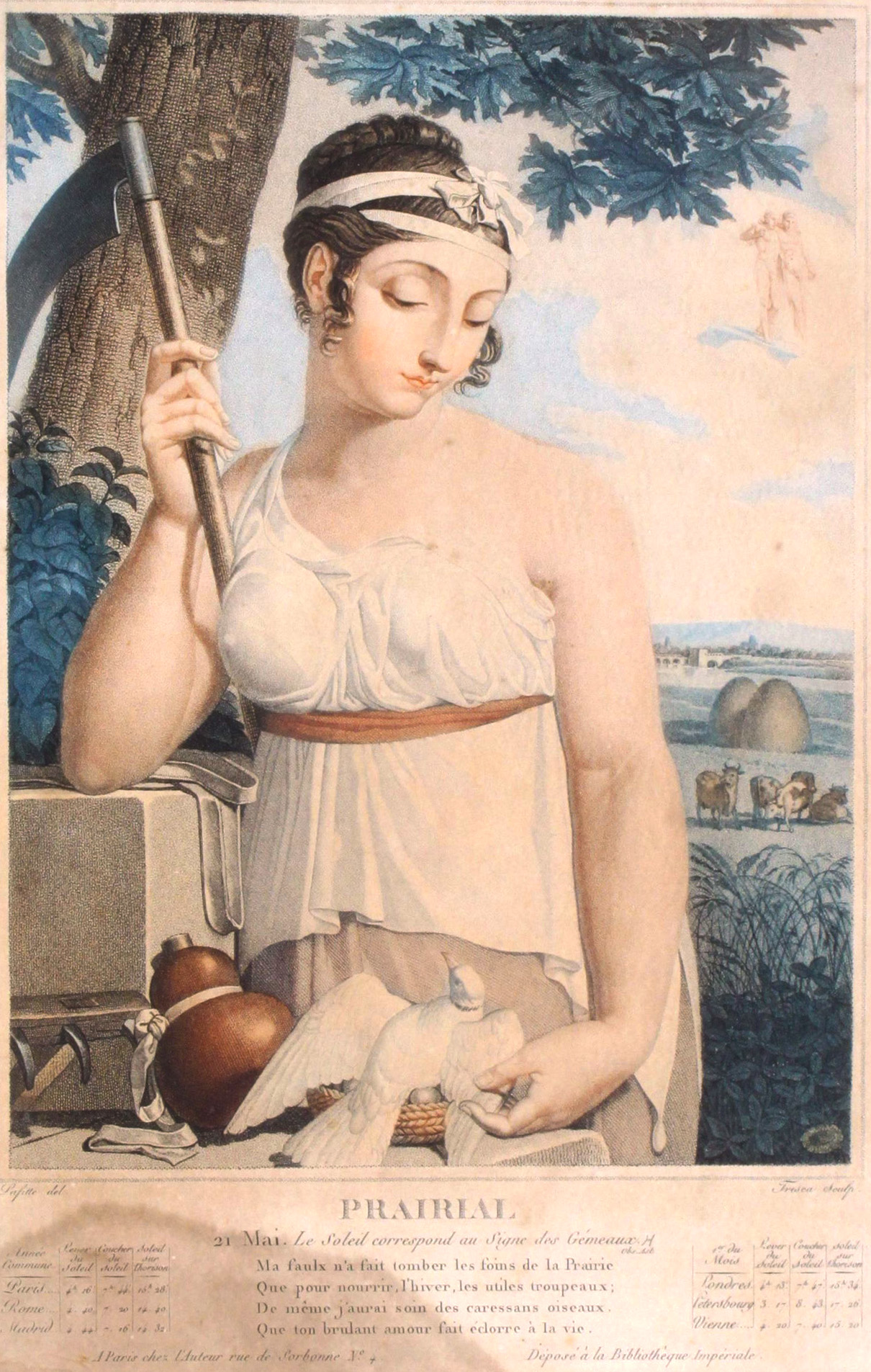
Prairial

02:03:52
Time of day - 24 h/day
Greenwich

Year: 7
Month: Prairial
Year: VII

Day of the 10-day
week (décade)
Primidi
Duodi
Tridi
Quartidi
Quintidi
Sextidi
Septidi
Octidi
Nonidi
Décadi

décade 25
1	Monday; 20 May 1799
2	Tuesday; 21 May 1799
3	Wednesday; 22 May 1799
4	Thursday; 23 May 1799
5	Friday; 24 May 1799
6	Saturday; 25 May 1799
7	Sunday; 26 May 1799
8	Monday; 27 May 1799
9	Tuesday; 28 May 1799
10	Wednesday; 29 May 1799

décade 26
11	Thursday; 30 May 1799
12	Friday; 31 May 1799
13	Saturday; 1 June 1799
14	Sunday; 2 June 1799
15	Monday; 3 June 1799
16	Tuesday; 4 June 1799
17	Wednesday; 5 June 1799
18	Thursday; 6 June 1799
19	Friday; 7 June 1799
20	Saturday; 8 June 1799

décade 27
21	Sunday; 9 June 1799
22	Monday; 10 June 1799
23	Tuesday; 11 June 1799
24	Wednesday; 12 June 1799
25	Thursday; 13 June 1799
26	Friday; 14 June 1799
27	Saturday; 15 June 1799
28	Sunday; 16 June 1799
29	Monday; 17 June 1799
30	Tuesday; 18 June 1799

Decimal time – 10 h/day
Paris
0:86:01

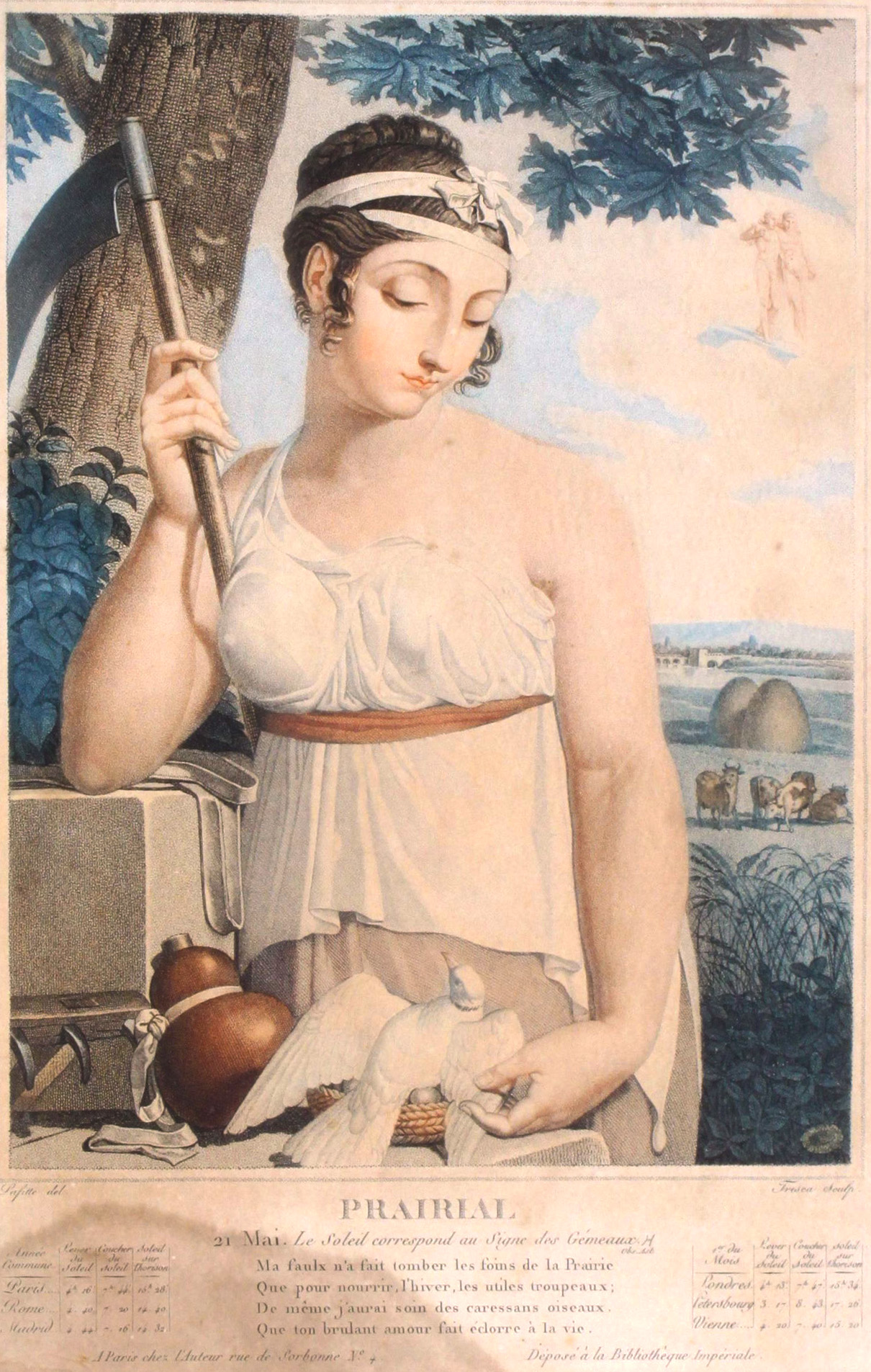
Prairial

02:03:52
Time of day - 24 h/day
Greenwich

Year: 8
Month: Prairial
Year: VIII

Day of the 10-day
week (décade)
Primidi
Duodi
Tridi
Quartidi
Quintidi
Sextidi
Septidi
Octidi
Nonidi
Décadi

décade 25
1	Wednesday; 21 May 1800
2	Thursday; 22 May 1800
3	Friday; 23 May 1800
4	Saturday; 24 May 1800
5	Sunday; 25 May 1800
6	Monday; 26 May 1800
7	Tuesday; 27 May 1800
8	Wednesday; 28 May 1800
9	Thursday; 29 May 1800
10	Friday; 30 May 1800

décade 26
11	Saturday; 31 May 1800
12	Sunday; 1 June 1800
13	Monday; 2 June 1800
14	Tuesday; 3 June 1800
15	Wednesday; 4 June 1800
16	Thursday; 5 June 1800
17	Friday; 6 June 1800
18	Saturday; 7 June 1800
19	Sunday; 8 June 1800
20	Monday; 9 June 1800

décade 27
21	Tuesday; 10 June 1800
22	Wednesday; 11 June 1800
23	Thursday; 12 June 1800
24	Friday; 13 June 1800
25	Saturday; 14 June 1800
26	Sunday; 15 June 1800
27	Monday; 16 June 1800
28	Tuesday; 17 June 1800
29	Wednesday; 18 June 1800
30	Thursday; 19 June 1800

Decimal time – 10 h/day
Paris
0:86:01

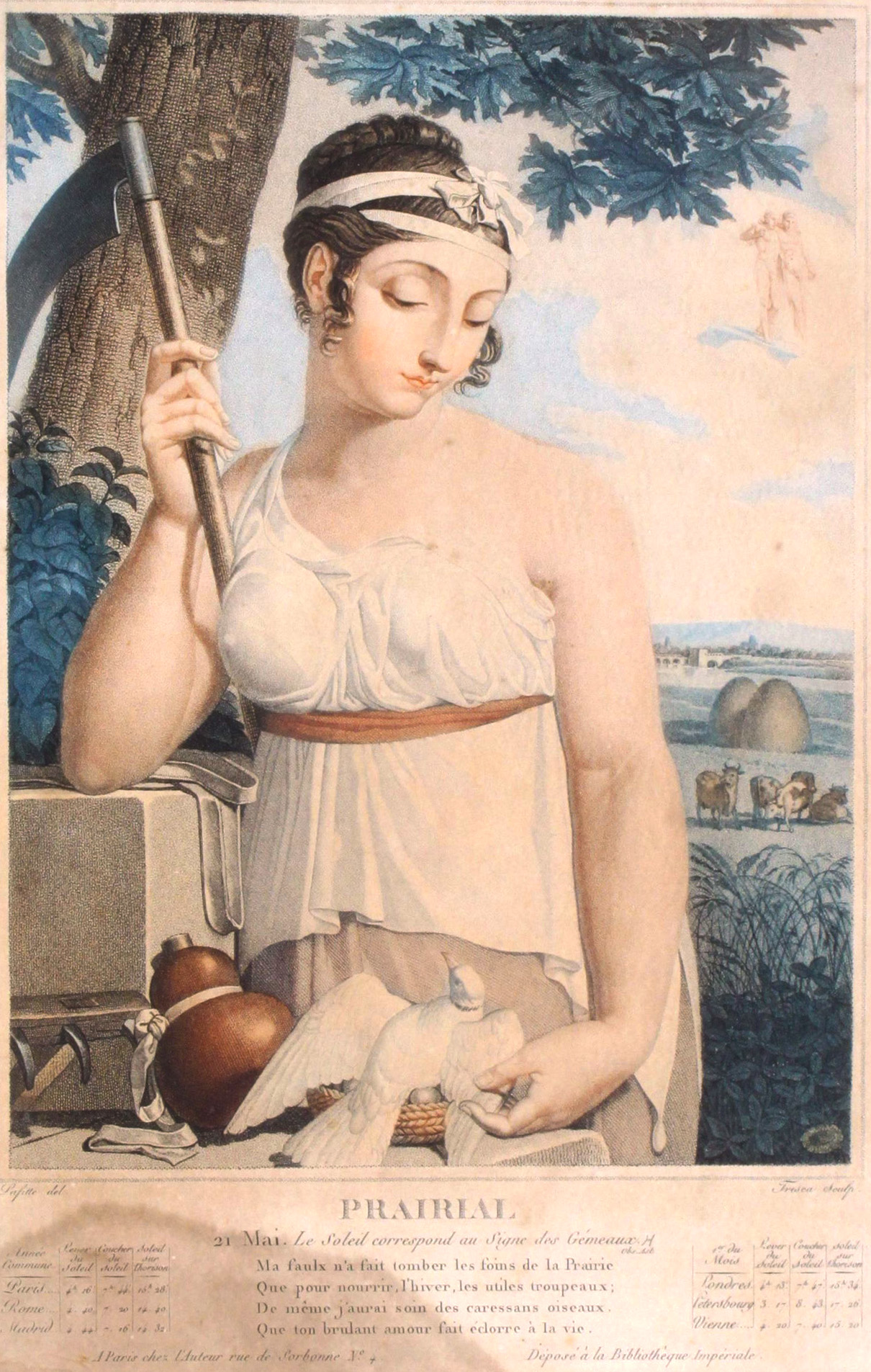
Prairial

02:03:52
Time of day - 24 h/day
Greenwich

Year: 9
Month: Prairial
Year: IX

Day of the 10-day
week (décade)
Primidi
Duodi
Tridi
Quartidi
Quintidi
Sextidi
Septidi
Octidi
Nonidi
Décadi

décade 25
1	Thursday; 21 May 1801
2	Friday; 22 May 1801
3	Saturday; 23 May 1801
4	Sunday; 24 May 1801
5	Monday; 25 May 1801
6	Tuesday; 26 May 1801
7	Wednesday; 27 May 1801
8	Thursday; 28 May 1801
9	Friday; 29 May 1801
10	Saturday; 30 May 1801

décade 26
11	Sunday; 31 May 1801
12	Monday; 1 June 1801
13	Tuesday; 2 June 1801
14	Wednesday; 3 June 1801
15	Thursday; 4 June 1801
16	Friday; 5 June 1801
17	Saturday; 6 June 1801
18	Sunday; 7 June 1801
19	Monday; 8 June 1801
20	Tuesday; 9 June 1801

décade 27
21	Wednesday; 10 June 1801
22	Thursday; 11 June 1801
23	Friday; 12 June 1801
24	Saturday; 13 June 1801
25	Sunday; 14 June 1801
26	Monday; 15 June 1801
27	Tuesday; 16 June 1801
28	Wednesday; 17 June 1801
29	Thursday; 18 June 1801
30	Friday; 19 June 1801

Decimal time – 10 h/day
Paris
0:86:01

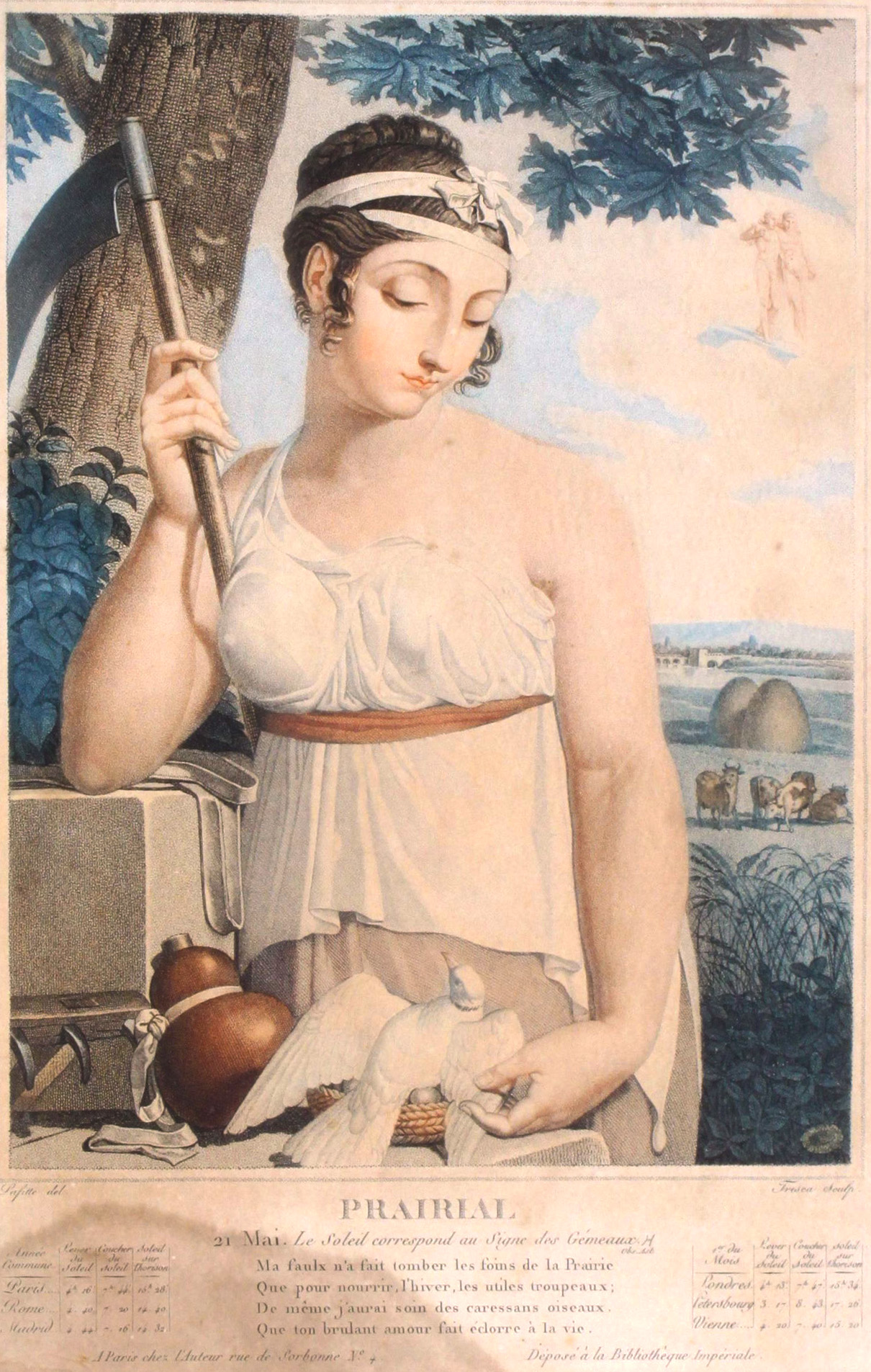
Prairial

02:03:52
Time of day - 24 h/day
Greenwich

Year: 10
Month: Prairial
Year: X

Day of the 10-day
week (décade)
Primidi
Duodi
Tridi
Quartidi
Quintidi
Sextidi
Septidi
Octidi
Nonidi
Décadi

décade 25
1	Friday; 21 May 1802
2	Saturday; 22 May 1802
3	Sunday; 23 May 1802
4	Monday; 24 May 1802
5	Tuesday; 25 May 1802
6	Wednesday; 26 May 1802
7	Thursday; 27 May 1802
8	Friday; 28 May 1802
9	Saturday; 29 May 1802
10	Sunday; 30 May 1802

décade 26
11	Monday; 31 May 1802
12	Tuesday; 1 June 1802
13	Wednesday; 2 June 1802
14	Thursday; 3 June 1802
15	Friday; 4 June 1802
16	Saturday; 5 June 1802
17	Sunday; 6 June 1802
18	Monday; 7 June 1802
19	Tuesday; 8 June 1802
20	Wednesday; 9 June 1802

décade 27
21	Thursday; 10 June 1802
22	Friday; 11 June 1802
23	Saturday; 12 June 1802
24	Sunday; 13 June 1802
25	Monday; 14 June 1802
26	Tuesday; 15 June 1802
27	Wednesday; 16 June 1802
28	Thursday; 17 June 1802
29	Friday; 18 June 1802
30	Saturday; 19 June 1802

Decimal time – 10 h/day
Paris
0:86:01

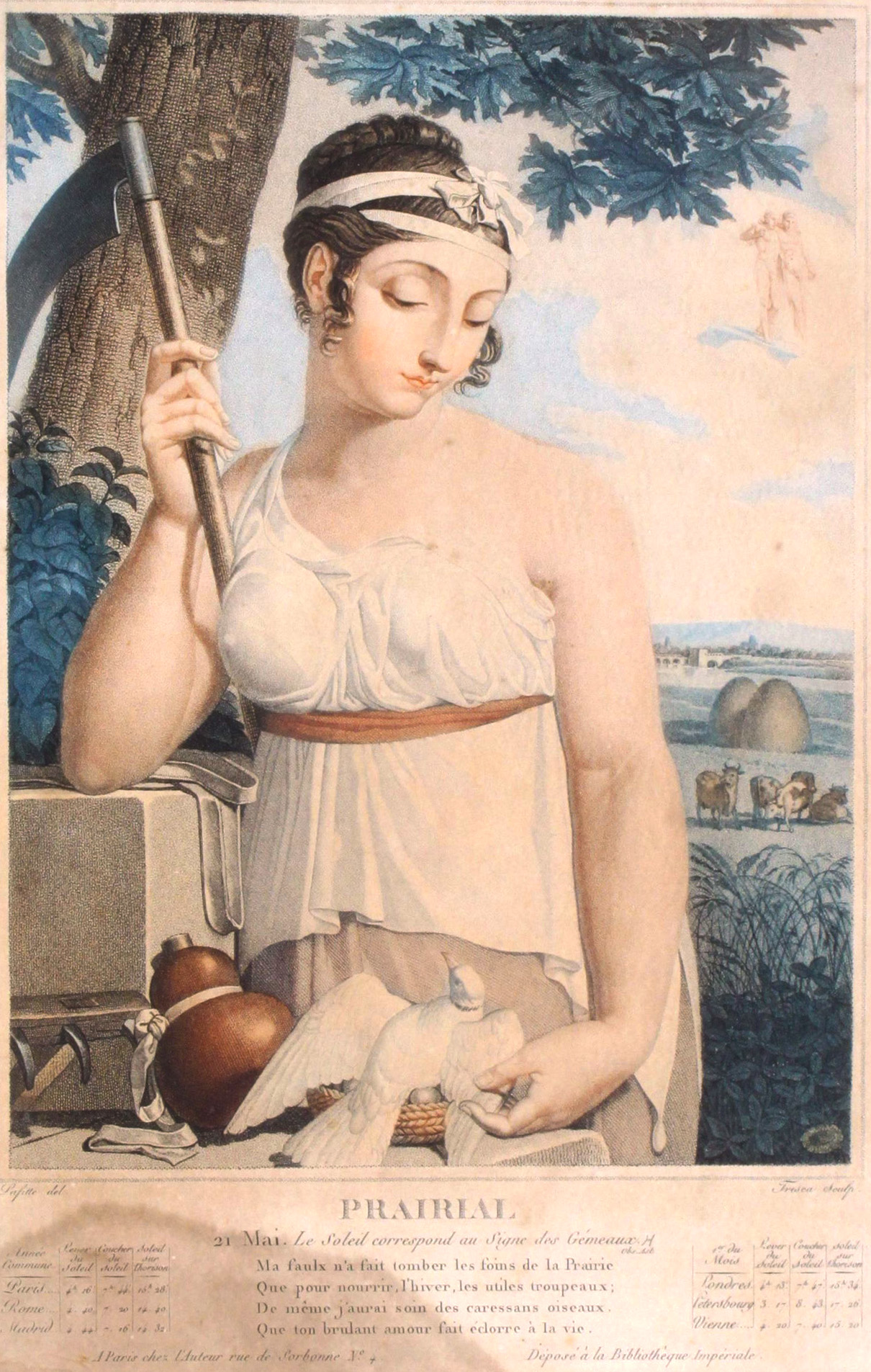
Prairial

02:03:52
Time of day - 24 h/day
Greenwich

Year: 11
Month: Prairial
Year: XI

Day of the 10-day
week (décade)
Primidi
Duodi
Tridi
Quartidi
Quintidi
Sextidi
Septidi
Octidi
Nonidi
Décadi

décade 25
1	Saturday; 21 May 1803
2	Sunday; 22 May 1803
3	Monday; 23 May 1803
4	Tuesday; 24 May 1803
5	Wednesday; 25 May 1803
6	Thursday; 26 May 1803
7	Friday; 27 May 1803
8	Saturday; 28 May 1803
9	Sunday; 29 May 1803
10	Monday; 30 May 1803

décade 26
11	Tuesday; 31 May 1803
12	Wednesday; 1 June 1803
13	Thursday; 2 June 1803
14	Friday; 3 June 1803
15	Saturday; 4 June 1803
16	Sunday; 5 June 1803
17	Monday; 6 June 1803
18	Tuesday; 7 June 1803
19	Wednesday; 8 June 1803
20	Thursday; 9 June 1803

décade 27
21	Friday; 10 June 1803
22	Saturday; 11 June 1803
23	Sunday; 12 June 1803
24	Monday; 13 June 1803
25	Tuesday; 14 June 1803
26	Wednesday; 15 June 1803
27	Thursday; 16 June 1803
28	Friday; 17 June 1803
29	Saturday; 18 June 1803
30	Sunday; 19 June 1803

Decimal time – 10 h/day
Paris
0:86:01

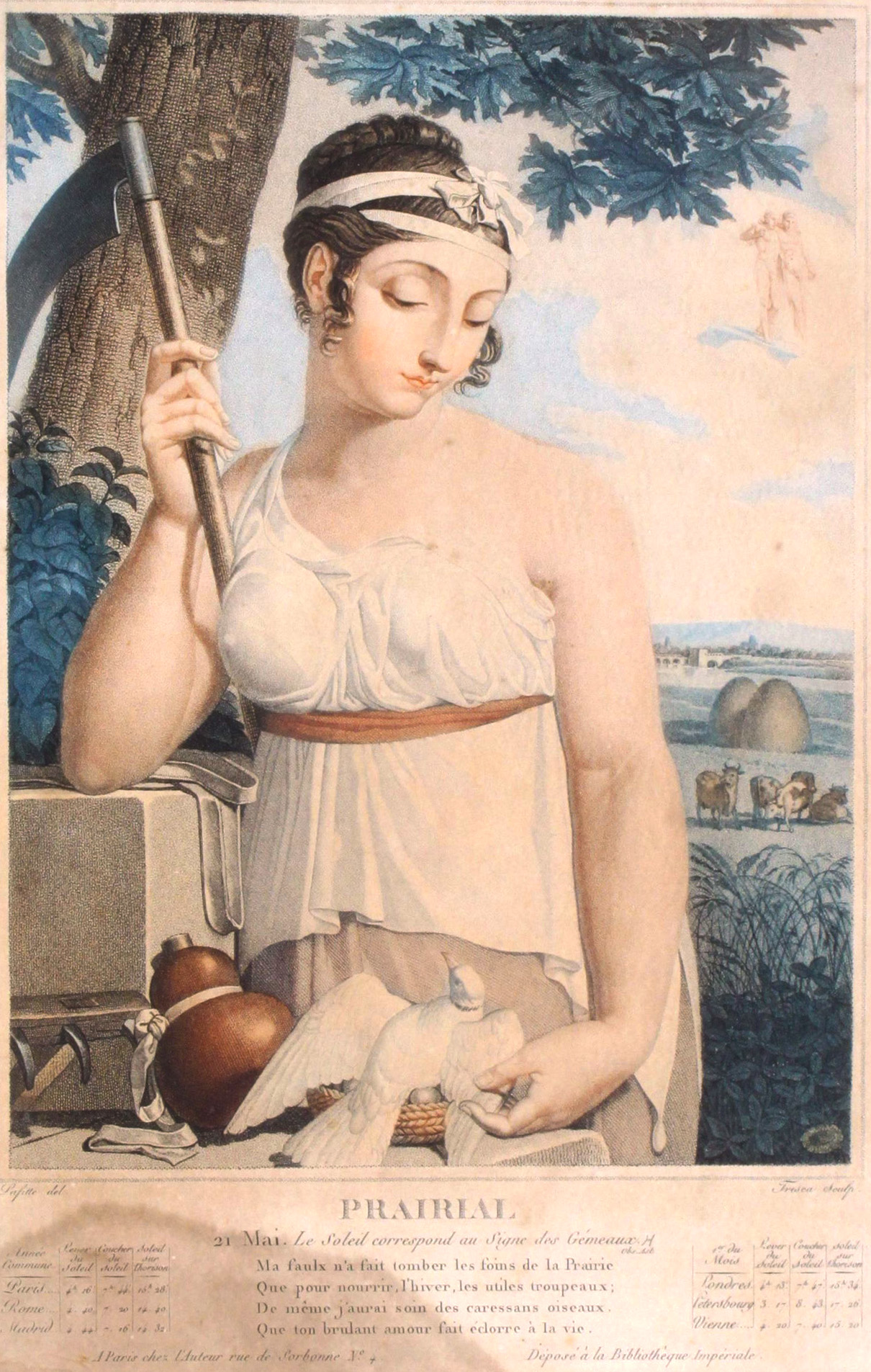
Prairial

02:03:52
Time of day - 24 h/day
Greenwich

Year: 12
Month: Prairial
Year: XII

Day of the 10-day
week (décade)
Primidi
Duodi
Tridi
Quartidi
Quintidi
Sextidi
Septidi
Octidi
Nonidi
Décadi

décade 25
1	Monday; 21 May 1804
2	Tuesday; 22 May 1804
3	Wednesday; 23 May 1804
4	Thursday; 24 May 1804
5	Friday; 25 May 1804
6	Saturday; 26 May 1804
7	Sunday; 27 May 1804
8	Monday; 28 May 1804
9	Tuesday; 29 May 1804
10	Wednesday; 30 May 1804

décade 26
11	Thursday; 31 May 1804
12	Friday; 1 June 1804
13	Saturday; 2 June 1804
14	Sunday; 3 June 1804
15	Monday; 4 June 1804
16	Tuesday; 5 June 1804
17	Wednesday; 6 June 1804
18	Thursday; 7 June 1804
19	Friday; 8 June 1804
20	Saturday; 9 June 1804

décade 27
21	Sunday; 10 June 1804
22	Monday; 11 June 1804
23	Tuesday; 12 June 1804
24	Wednesday; 13 June 1804
25	Thursday; 14 June 1804
26	Friday; 15 June 1804
27	Saturday; 16 June 1804
28	Sunday; 17 June 1804
29	Monday; 18 June 1804
30	Tuesday; 19 June 1804

Decimal time – 10 h/day
Paris
0:86:01

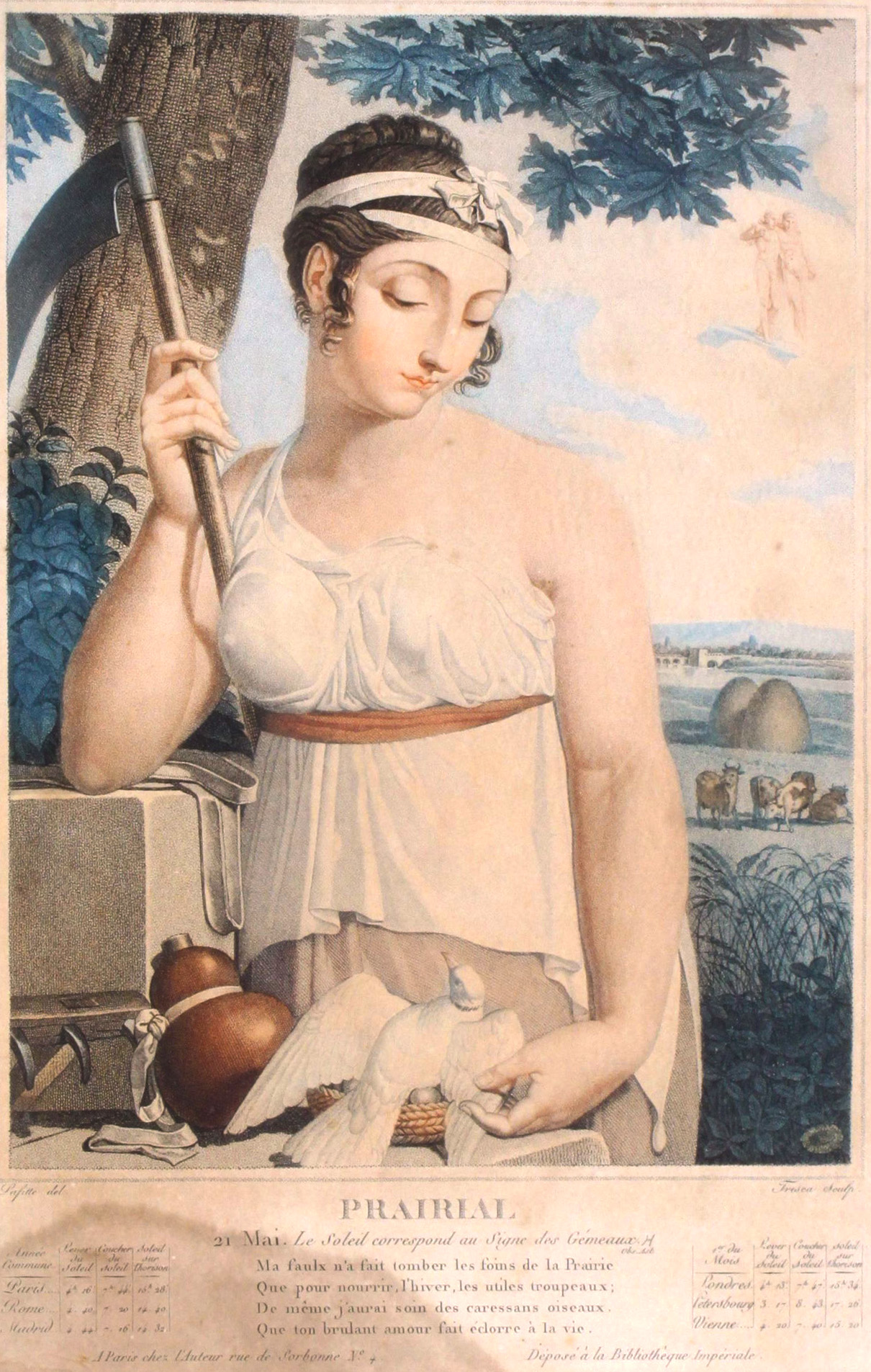
Prairial

02:03:52
Time of day - 24 h/day
Greenwich

Year: 13
Month: Prairial
Year: XIII

Day of the 10-day
week (décade)
Primidi
Duodi
Tridi
Quartidi
Quintidi
Sextidi
Septidi
Octidi
Nonidi
Décadi

décade 25
1	Tuesday; 21 May 1805
2	Wednesday; 22 May 1805
3	Thursday; 23 May 1805
4	Friday; 24 May 1805
5	Saturday; 25 May 1805
6	Sunday; 26 May 1805
7	Monday; 27 May 1805
8	Tuesday; 28 May 1805
9	Wednesday; 29 May 1805
10	Thursday; 30 May 1805

décade 26
11	Friday; 31 May 1805
12	Saturday; 1 June 1805
13	Sunday; 2 June 1805
14	Monday; 3 June 1805
15	Tuesday; 4 June 1805
16	Wednesday; 5 June 1805
17	Thursday; 6 June 1805
18	Friday; 7 June 1805
19	Saturday; 8 June 1805
20	Sunday; 9 June 1805

décade 27
21	Monday; 10 June 1805
22	Tuesday; 11 June 1805
23	Wednesday; 12 June 1805
24	Thursday; 13 June 1805
25	Friday; 14 June 1805
26	Saturday; 15 June 1805
27	Sunday; 16 June 1805
28	Monday; 17 June 1805
29	Tuesday; 18 June 1805
30	Wednesday; 19 June 1805

Decimal time – 10 h/day
Paris
0:86:01

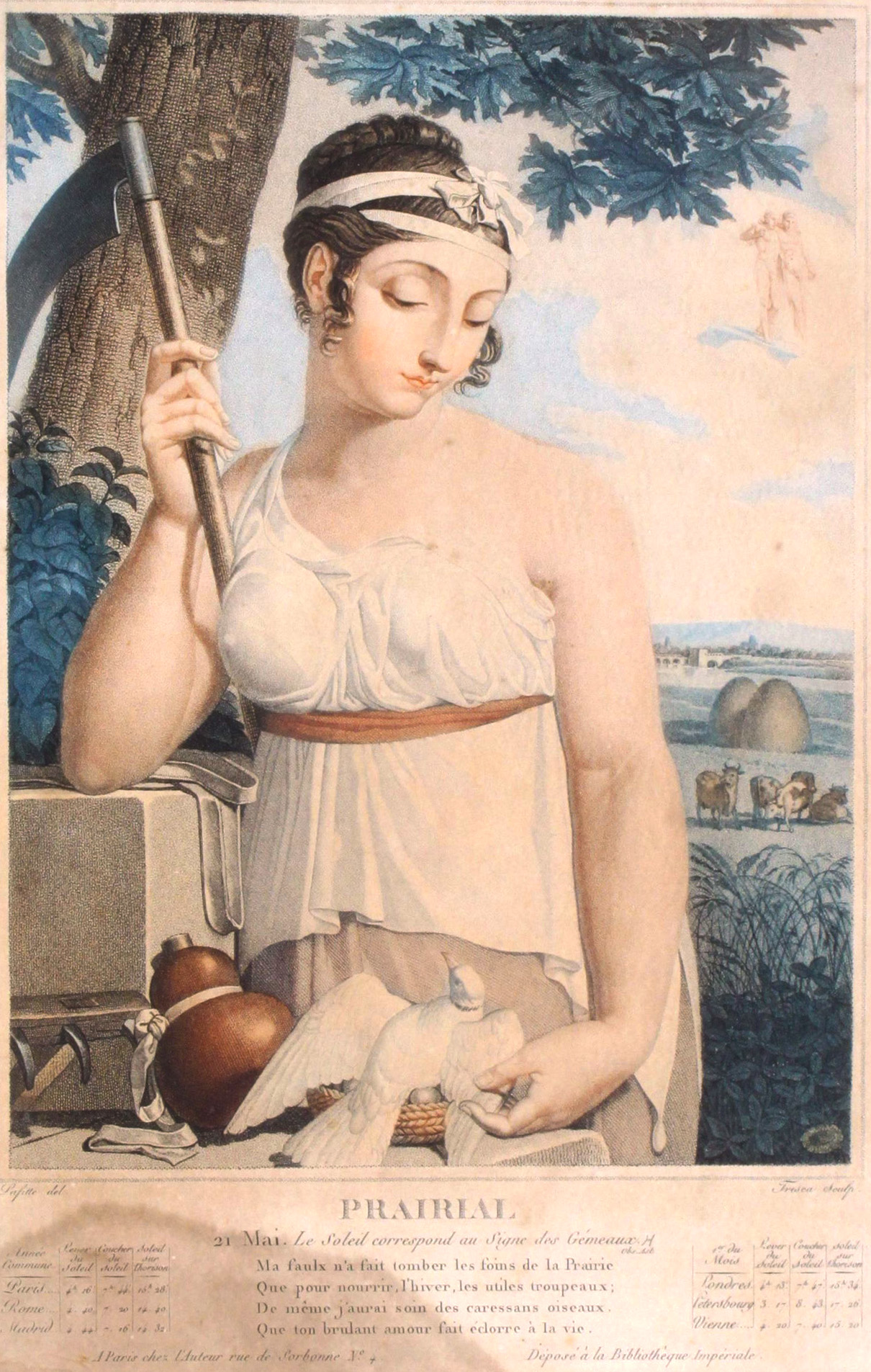
Prairial

02:03:52
Time of day - 24 h/day
Greenwich

Year: 14
Month: Prairial
Year: XIV

Day of the 10-day
week (décade)
Primidi
Duodi
Tridi
Quartidi
Quintidi
Sextidi
Septidi
Octidi
Nonidi
Décadi

décade 25
1	Wednesday; 21 May 1806
2	Thursday; 22 May 1806
3	Friday; 23 May 1806
4	Saturday; 24 May 1806
5	Sunday; 25 May 1806
6	Monday; 26 May 1806
7	Tuesday; 27 May 1806
8	Wednesday; 28 May 1806
9	Thursday; 29 May 1806
10	Friday; 30 May 1806

décade 26
11	Saturday; 31 May 1806
12	Sunday; 1 June 1806
13	Monday; 2 June 1806
14	Tuesday; 3 June 1806
15	Wednesday; 4 June 1806
16	Thursday; 5 June 1806
17	Friday; 6 June 1806
18	Saturday; 7 June 1806
19	Sunday; 8 June 1806
20	Monday; 9 June 1806

décade 27
21	Tuesday; 10 June 1806
22	Wednesday; 11 June 1806
23	Thursday; 12 June 1806
24	Friday; 13 June 1806
25	Saturday; 14 June 1806
26	Sunday; 15 June 1806
27	Monday; 16 June 1806
28	Tuesday; 17 June 1806
29	Wednesday; 18 June 1806
30	Thursday; 19 June 1806

Decimal time – 10 h/day
Paris
0:86:01

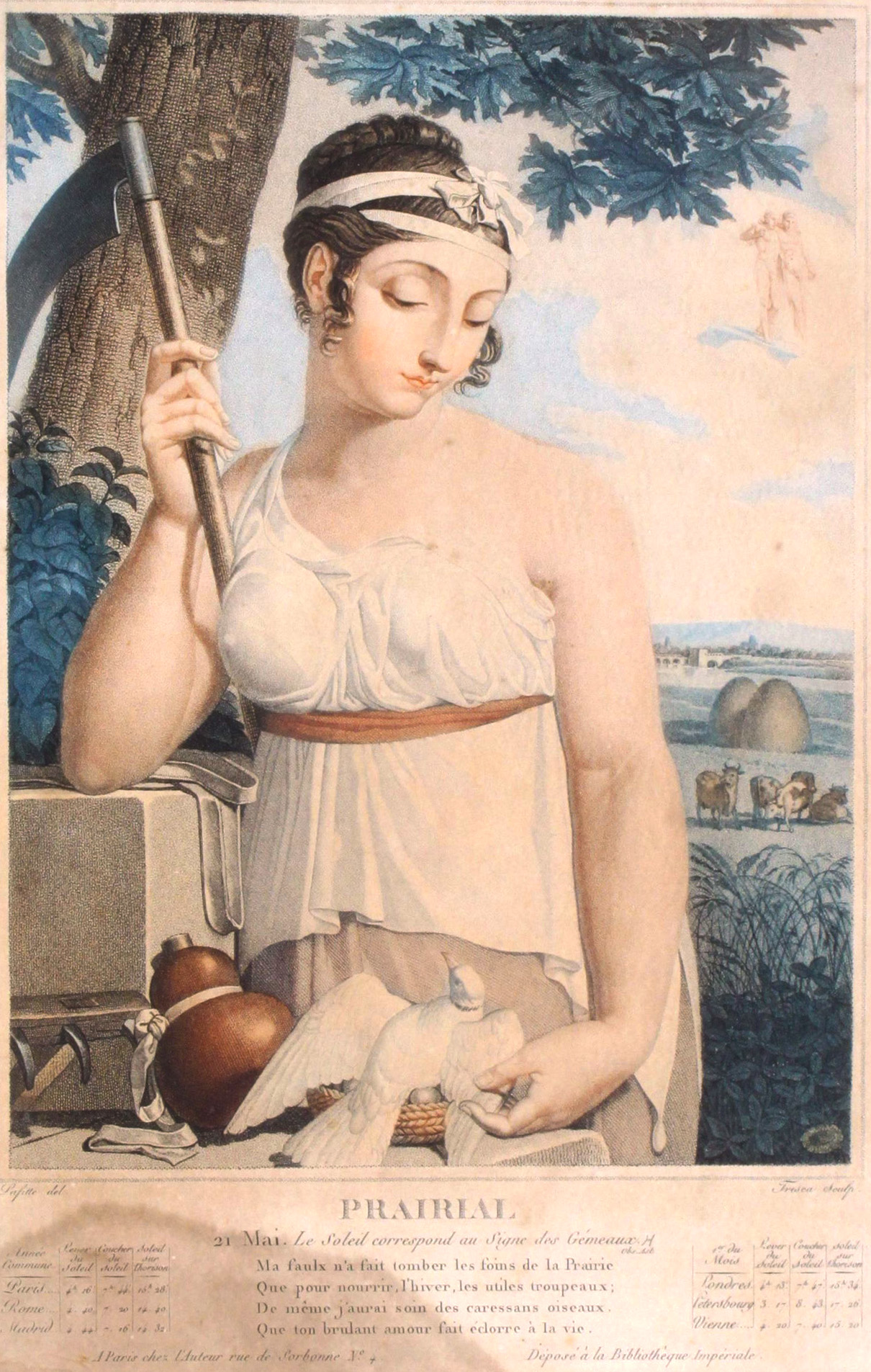
Prairial

02:03:52
Time of day - 24 h/day
Greenwich

== Day name table ==
Like all FRC months, Prairial lasted 30 days and was divided into three 10-day weeks called décades (decades). Every day had the name of an agricultural plant, except the 5th (Quintidi) and 10th day (Decadi) of every decade, which had the name of a domestic animal (Quintidi) or an agricultural tool (Decadi).

	1^{re} Décade		2^{e} Décade		3^{e} Décade
Primidi	1.	Luserne (Lucerne)	11.	Fraise (Strawberry)	21.	Barbeau (Cornflower)
Duodi	2.	Hémérocalle (Daylily)	12.	Bétoine (Betony)	22.	Camomille (Chamomile)
Tridi	3.	Trèfle (Clover)	13.	Pois (Pea)	23.	Chèvrefeuille (Honeysuckle)
Quartidi	4.	Angélique (Angelica)	14.	Acacia (Acacia)	24.	Caille lait (Bedstraw)
Quintidi	5.	Canard (Duck)	15.	Caille (Quail)	25.	Tanche (Tench)
Sextidi	6.	Mélisse (Melissa)	16.	Œillet (Pink)	26.	Jasmin (Jasmine)
Septidi	7.	Fromental (Oat Grass)	17.	Sureau (Elder)	27.	Verveine (Vervain)
Octidi	8.	Martagon (Martagon Lily)	18.	Pavot (Poppy)	28.	Thym (Thyme)
Nonidi	9.	Serpolet (Wild Thyme)	19.	Tilleul (Lime Tree)	29.	Pivoine (Peony)
Decadi	10.	Faulx (Scythe)	20.	Fourche (Pitchfork)	30.	Chariot (Cart)

== Conversion table ==
Table for conversion between Republican and Gregorian Calendar
for the month "Prairial"

I. / II. / III. / IV. / V. / VI. / VII.
1	2	3	4	5	6	7	8	9	10	11	12	13	14	15	16	17	18	19	20	21	22	23	24	25	26	27	28	29	30
20	21	22	23	24	25	26	27	28	29	30	31	1	2	3	4	5	6	7	8	9	10	11	12	13	14	15	16	17	18
May / 1793 / 1794 / 1795 / 1796 / 1797 / 1798 / 1799 / June

VIII. / IX. / X. / XI. / XII. / XIII.
1	2	3	4	5	6	7	8	9	10	11	12	13	14	15	16	17	18	19	20	21	22	23	24	25	26	27	28	29	30
21	22	23	24	25	26	27	28	29	30	31	1	2	3	4	5	6	7	8	9	10	11	12	13	14	15	16	17	18	19
May / 1800 / 1801 / 1802 / 1803 / 1804 / 1805 / June

== See also ==
- Revolt of 1 Prairial Year III
