= Glenn Price =

Canadian conductor

Dr. Glenn D. Price is a Canadian conductor who is the Director of Performing and Visual Arts at the California Institute of Technology (Caltech), where he currently conducts the Symphony Orchestra and Wind Orchestra. He was formerly the Director of Wind Studies at the Cincinnati College-Conservatory of Music.

== Career ==
Dr. Price holds a B.Mus. from the University of Toronto and an M.Mus. and D.M.A. from the Eastman School of Music at University of Rochester, with post-doctoral studies at the Toho Gakuen School of Music in Japan and the Tanglewood Music Center in the U.S., as well as in Europe and Russia. Active on the international scene, he has conducted professional and student orchestras and wind ensembles in over 30 countries.

Professor of Music (Emeritus) at the University of Calgary, and conductor of the Los Angeles-based contemporary chamber ensemble TEMPO since 2016, Dr. Price serves extensively as a prominent music educator, clinician, guest lecturer and speaker for a variety of professional organizations around the world.

Recent conducting engagements have included the Mozarteum Wind Orchestra (Austria), National Youth Wind Orchestra and Royal Northern College of Music (England), The Osakan Philharmonic Winds (Japan), People’s Liberation Army Band (China), Hungarian Railways Band (Hungary), Orquesta Latino America de Vientos (Colombia), Banda Nacional de San José (Costa Rica), Brazil Wind Orchestra (Brazil), Banda La Armónica de Buñol (Spain), and at international conferences such as WASBE, CBDNA, Midwest Clinic, MENC, BASBWE and the American Bandmasters Association.

Additionally, he has recorded for the Albany, Mark, Pro Percussio, Unical and Arktos labels, and conducted numerous notable soloists including Dame Evelyn Glennie, Christian Lindberg, Ney Rosauro, Jens Lindemann, Alain Trudel, Roger Webster, Kenneth Tse, Adam Frey, Simone Rebello, David Campbell, John Marcellus, Michael Burritt, David Rejano Cantero and Wayne Bergeron.

Dr. Price served as President of the World Association for Symphonic Band and Ensembles (WASBE), is also a composer, and author of the conducting text The Eloquent Conductor (GIA, 2016).
