= Jérôme Dorival =

French clarinetist, composer and musicologist

Jérôme Dorival (born in 1952) is a French clarinetist, composer and musicologist.

== Biography ==
Born in Paris, Jérôme Dorival is one of the four sons of historian and art critic, Bernard Dorival. He studied at the Conservatoire de Paris with Norbert Dufourcq and Rémy Stricker, and at the Sorbonne with Albert Soboul, Pierre Vilar, Dominique Julia and Alphonse Dupront. His doctoral thesis in musicology deals with La Cantatille en France au XVIII, under the direction of Jacques Chailley.

As a researcher, he devoted himself especially to the pianist and pedagogue Hélène de Montgeroult, professor at the brand new Conservatoire in 1795 and composer. For the reissue of the scores of Montgeroult, Dorival founded the Éditions Modulation.

He is professor of music history at the Conservatoire de Lyon and in Lausanne.

As a composer, he has been a member of the centre national de création musicale since 1985.

== Work ==
=== Compositions ===
- 1993: Le son des choses dans les ténèbres, hommage to Georges Perec
- 2001: La cathédrale, nocturne for piano, hommage to Nicolas de Staël.

=== Musicological writings ===
- La Cantate française au XVIII. Que sais-je ? 3476 (in French). Paris: PUF. 1999. p. 127. ISBN 2-13-049974-0. OCLC 237398633.
- Le Concerto pour clavier : approches multiples, partition, histoire, art, with Dominique Dubreuil and Daniel Gaudet, Aléas, 2001 OCLC 690736252.
- (dir.) Les concerts à Lyon au 17e siècle, Musée Gadagne, Musée historique de Lyon, 2004 OCLC 470093497
- Hélène de Montgeroult; La Marquise et la Marseillaise. Biographie (in French). Lyon: Symétrie. 2006. pp. VI-421. ISBN 2-914373-16-3. OCLC 778035619. Dorival2006.

Articles

- (preface) Musique et notations, Aléas, series "Collection Musique et Sciences", 1999 OCLC 612142848
- « Le Plein du vide by Xu Yi, étude esthétique et analytique », in Tempus perfectum No 1 (August 2011), Symétrie, 24 pages ISBN 978-2-36485-000-2, OCLC 422114383
- « Paule de Lestang, chanteuse, pianiste et claveciniste : une musicienne aux multiples talents », in Tempus perfectum No 7, Symétrie, 27 pages ISBN 978-2-36485-006-4, OCLC 863125127
- « À propos du cas Montgeroult : réflexions sur la constitution et l’écriture des « grands récits » musicologiques », in Aline Tauzin, Musique, Femmes et Interdits, Symétrie, ISBN 978-2-918961-03-1, (pp. 119–146).

== Discography ==
- Doubles 3 composed with James Giroudon, in Musiques pour cordes - Ensemble instrumental, dir. Éric Sprogis (1992, Forlane UCD16664) BnF 38220157g
- Le son des choses dans les ténèbres , in À voix basse - ensemble Grame (1995, Grame GR005) BnF 383493820
