= Janet Sung =

American musician

Janet Sung is an American classical violinist. Born in New York City, she began studying the violin at age 7 and debuted at the age of nine with the Pittsburgh Symphony Orchestra. She then studied privately with Josef Gingold for ten years. She received her B.A. from Harvard University, and then studied at the Juilliard School.

Sung has performed as a soloist and with numerous orchestras and also teaches violin at the DePaul University School of Music in Chicago.
