= Badke Quartet =

String quartet

The Badke Quartet is a British string quartet. Founded in 2002 at London's Royal Academy of Music, it regularly performs at leading venues throughout the UK, Ireland and the rest of Europe.

In 2014, the quartet was appointed quartet in residence at Royal Holloway University of London. From 2005 to 2009 the Quartet held the Senior Leverhulme Chamber Music Fellowship at the Royal Academy of Music.

The members of the quartet are Charlotte Scott and Emma Parker, violins, Jon Thorne, viola, and Jonathan Byers, cello. The quartet has worked with some of the world's greatest string quartets and studied with Gabor Takács-Nagy at IMS Prussia Cove and members of the Alban Berg Quartet in Cologne.

Edward Bhesania of The Strad magazine wrote that "A melt-in-the-ears quality ... made the atonality of the Britten less of a challenge and the Haydn that much sweeter". A review in de Volkskrant wrote that the group's playing was "of the utmost delicacy. The response from the hall: applause, stamping feet and enthusiastic whistling".

The Badke Quartet regularly performs at concert halls and festivals in the UK and abroad, including the Aldeburgh, Aix-en-Provence and Verbier Festivals, West Cork Chamber Music Festival, London's Wigmore Hall, Kings Place, and the Musikverein in Vienna. The quartet has collaborated with musicians Mark Padmore, Sir Thomas Allen, John Mark Ainsley, and others.

The quartet broadcasts frequently live on BBC Radio 3 as well as on Classic FM, Lyric FM (Ireland), ABC Classic FM (Australia) and for the European Broadcasting Union. In 2007, it won 1st prize and audience prize at the 5th Melbourne International Chamber Music Competition.
