= Eugene Migliaro Corporon =

American conductor

- Born: April 26, 1947 (age 79)
- Genres: Contemporary, classical
- Occupations: Conductor, music professor, author
- Instruments: Clarinet, bass clarinet
- Years active: 1969-present

Eugene Migliaro Corporon is an American conductor known for his work with wind ensembles, scholar of wind/band music repertoire and co-editor of two literature catalogs,Wind Ensemble/Band Repertoire (1984) and Wind Ensemble Literature (1975). He is also the co-editor of ten volumes of the Teaching Music Through Performance in Band series (GIA Publications). He co-hosted the Inner Game of Music videotape.

== Works ==
- Reynolds, R. & Corporon, E. (1975) Wind Ensemble Literature University of Wisconsin–Madison.
- Wallace, D., & Corporon, E. (1984). Wind ensemble/band repertoire. Greeley, CO: University of Northern Colorado.
