= University Heights Symphonic Band =

Background information
- Origin: University Heights, Ohio
- Genres: Classical
- Years active: 1970–Present
- Website: universityheightsband.org

The University Heights Symphonic Band is a 50-member all-volunteer wind ensemble sponsored by the City of University Heights, Ohio, which performs across the Cleveland metropolitan area. The community band performs a varied repertoire, including contemporary classical music, core wind band literature, film scores, Broadway musical selections, and popular music. It is a member of the Association of Concert Bands, and membership is by open audition.

The band was founded by Dr. Harvey Sisler in 1970. The band was named a 2021 Finalist for The American Prize in Band/Wind Ensemble Performance – Community Division.
