= Brooklyn Wind Symphony =

Community band based in Brooklyn, New York, USA

The Brooklyn Wind Symphony (BKWS) is a community band based in Brooklyn, New York.

== Background ==
Founded in 2008 as the Grand Street Community Band (GSCB), the band is a select, all-volunteer ensemble accepted by open auditions. The group split into two in 2011 to allow for more members by reinstating the Grand Street Community Band as an all-volunteer ensemble that rehearses and performs standard wind band repertoire.

The mission of BKWS is to promote lifelong participation in music while increasing public awareness of wind bands and the literature written for them. Advanced instrumentalists, regardless of profession, have the opportunity to play the most esteemed repertoire for wind bands. The ensemble continues to add new repertoire by commissioning new works by talented composers, such as David Maslanka, Michael Markowski, and Viet Cuong.

== Performances ==
The ensemble traditionally performs two concerts in the fall, two concerts in the spring, and summer concerts outside in the parks of New York City. BWKS and GSCB are governed by the Metropolitan Music Community (MMC) Board of Directors. The MMC is a New York State 501(c)(3) nonprofit organization.

The Brooklyn Wind Symphony performed at the 67th and 76th Midwest Clinic in December 2013 and December 2022 held in Chicago, Illinois. BKWS was the first New York City ensemble to be invited to participate as a performing band in the prestigious annual event's history, which attracts top musicians and music educators from all over the world. In July 2015, the ensemble was invited to perform at the 16th International World Association for Symphonic Bands and Ensembles (WASBE) Conference in San Jose, California.

== Staff ==
- Jeff W. Ball, Founder/Conductor
- Jasmine Britt, MMC Artistic Director
- Kimberly Roof, Assistant Conductor/MMC President
- Andrew Schwartz, MMC Executive Director
- Kate Jiranek, MMC Managing Director

== See also ==
- Lesbian & Gay Big Apple Corps
- Northshore Concert Band
- The American Band
