= Jerry Brubaker =

American composer and arranger

Jerry Brubaker (born 1946) is an American composer and arranger of more than 300 works of music for concert band, symphony, and chorus and a professional French horn soloist.

== Education and career ==
In 1968, Brubaker received his undergraduate degree from the Eastman School of Music and later pursued a Master of Music degree from the Catholic University of America.

Brubaker served for 30 years in the United States Navy Band in Washington, D.C., as a French horn soloist and composer and arranger. In 1985, he became the band's chief arranger, and held that position until his retirement from the navy in 1998.

After retiring from the military, Brubaker has performed and arranged for the Village Band of Estes Park (CO), City of Fairfax (VA) Band and the Virginia Grand Military Band and is the current president of the Association of Concert Bands. He is an exclusive composer and arranger for Alfred Publishing Co. Inc., and has written commissions for musical organizations across the United States, such as the East Winds Symphonic Band in Pittsburgh, Pennsylvania.

== Personal life ==
Brubaker was born in Altoona, Pennsylvania, in 1946 and was an active musician throughout his early years. During grade school, he performed in a German band with classmates Terry Detweiler and Allen Gibboney. He graduated from the Altoona Area School District in 1964 and received a "Distinguished Alumni Award" from school district in 2006.

He was married to Virginia (Ginny) Brubaker until she died on July 23, 2011. He currently lives in Estes Park, Colorado.

== Recordings ==
- Concert Suite from The Polar Express, arr. Jerry Brubaker
- Star Wars Heroes, arr. Jerry Brubaker
- Music of Disneyland, arr. Jerry Brubaker
- Suite from Hamilton, arr. Jerry Brubaker
- Peaceful Nation by Jerry Brubaker
- What's Up at the Symphony? Bugs Bunny's Greatest, arr. Jerry Brubaker
- Flower Duet (from Lakmé) arr. Jerry Brubaker
- How the Grinch Stole Christmas (Medley), arr. Jerry Brubaker
