= Peter Meechan (composer) =

Peter John Meechan
- Born: 29 January 1980 (age 46); Nuneaton, Warwickshire, England
- Occupation: Composer

Peter John Meechan (born 29 January 1980) is a British-Canadian composer, conductor, and music publisher.

== Life and education ==
Meechan studied musical composition at the Royal Northern College of Music in Manchester and received his Bachelor of Arts. He then studied at the University of Salford in Salford and received his PhD in musical composition.

He mostly writes works for concert and brass bands, but also for chamber ensembles and winds. His works for brass bands are often chosen as compulsory works for musical festivals and competitions. His works for concert band have been performed at the annual Midwest Clinic in Chicago and at the International Wind Festival held by the British Association of Symphonic Bands and Wind Ensembles by orchestras such as the Eastman Wind Ensemble, the Royal Northern College of Music Wind Orchestra, the Kew Wind Orchestra, and the Band of the Coldstream Guards. In 2006, he set up his own music publication company, Meechan Music. From 2006 to 2007, he was the composer of the well-known Black Dyke Band.

== Compositions ==
Below is a list of Meechan's compositions.

=== Works for concert band and brass band ===
- 2001–2002 Revamp, for brass band
- 2002 Crazy Diamonds Shining, for soprano saxophone and concert band
- 2002–2003 Three Stories - Three Worlds, concert for euphonium and brass band or concert band
  1. Hubris: The House of Atreus
  2. Discardation: Lament for Aerope
  3. New Order: Flight to Sparta
- 2004 Elegy, for solo euphonium (or trombone) and brass band or concert band
- 2004 Purcell Variants, for brass band
- 2005 Alu, for Baritone (or euphonium ) and brass band
- 2005 B of the Bang, for brass band (dedicated to Luc Vertommen) - premiered during the World Music Competition in Kerkrade by the Brass Band Buizingen
- 2005 Episodes and Echoes, for solo tuba and brass band or concert band
- 2005 Match Day, for brass band or concert band
- 2005 Requiem Paraphrases - on a theme by Mozart, for euphonium and brass band or concert band
- 2006 Carnival, for concert band
- 2006 Devil's Duel, for solo euphonium and brass band
- 2006 Lift Off, for concert band
- 2006 Hymn for Africa, for concert band
- 2006 Red Flame, for euphonium (of baritone) and brass band
- 2007 Apex, for trumpet (or cornet, bugle) and brass band
- 2007 Bang 2, for concert band
- 2007 Fanfare for a Festival, for brass band of concert band
- 2007 Macbeth, for brass band or concert band
  1. Witches
  2. Dagger
  3. General Macbeth
  4. Contemplations of Lady Macbeth
  5. Lament
  6. Tomorrow and tomorrow and tomorrow
  7. A spell still cast
  8. Final Battle
  9. Not of woman born
- 2007 These Mist Covered Mountains, for soprano saxophone (or alto saxophone) and concert band of for cornet en brass band
- 2008 Apex, for trumpet and concert band
- 2008 Apophenia, for trumpet and concert band of brass band
- 2008 Autumn Falling, for concert band
- 2008 Curtain Call, for brass band
- 2008 Devil's Duel, for solo euphonium solo and concert band
- 2008 Eternal Light, for concert band (dedicated to Geoffrey Brand and Michael Brand)
- 2008 Lament (from Macbeth), for brass band or concert band
- 2009 Epitaph (for Hillsborough), for brass band (or concert band) - in memory of the 96 victims of the Hillsborough disaster
- 2009 Scene From the Silver Plate, for trombone and brass band
- 2009 The Kármán Line, for concert band
- 2010 Chorlton Suite, for concert band
  1. Introduction
  2. Sunset
  3. Toccata
- 2010 Fenix Blue, for solo alto saxophone solo and concert band
- 2010 Fire in the Sky, for brass band
- 2010 Manchester Concertino, for cornet (or trumpet) and brass band
  1. Fanfare
  2. Dream
  3. Finale
- 2010 Sentinel, for brass band
- 2010 Shine, for solo tuba and brass band
- 2010 The Legend of King Arthur, for brass band of concert band
- 2010 Triptych (on a theme by Handel), for tenor horn and brass band
  1. Fanfare and theme
  2. Slow song
  3. Finale
- 2011 2nd Epitaph – Across the Water, for brass band or concert band
- Fields of Destruction, 3 songs for euphonium and concert band

=== Chamber music ===
- Break It Down, for trombone quartet
- Floating Dreams, for tuba and CD
- Introduction and Toccata, for tenor horn and piano
- JET A, for euphonium and CD
- Manchester Sketches, for brass quartet
- Moz!, for euphonium and brass ensemble (or piano)
- Storm, for brass quintet
