= North West Wind Ensemble =

Australian community wind band

Castle Hill RSL North West Wind Ensemble
- Wind band
- Short name: NWWE
- Founded: 2003; 23 years ago
- Location: Castle Hill, New South Wales, Australia
- Principal conductor: James Brice OAM
- Website: www.nwwe.org.au

Established in 2003, the Castle Hill RSL North West Wind Ensemble is an Australian community wind band.

Formed by graduated members of the Castle Hill RSL Youth Wind Orchestra who wished to continue playing music of the highest standard, NWWE attracts musicians from across Sydney to its base in the North West.

Regular participants in the Australian National and NSW State Band Championships in Open A Grade, the band has claimed nine such titles in its short history

== Competitions ==
=== 2011 Australian national competition ===
Over the 2011 Easter weekend the band travelled to Adelaide, South Australia for the National Band Championships to perform in the Open A Grade competition. Performing a program of works by Grainger, de Meij, Sparke and Sousa they scored 489 from a total of 500 points to win the championship for the third time in five attempts.

=== 2012 Australian national competition ===
On 8 April 2012, the band competed in Open A Grade at the National Championships held in Melbourne. Performing works by Frank Ticheli, Graham Lloyd, Philip Sparke and Julius Fučík they scored 493 of a possible 500 points, the highest of any wind band in history to retain the Prime Minister's Trophy.
