= Peter Meechan =

Peter Meechan may refer to:

- Peter Meechan (composer) (born 1980), British composer, conductor, and music publisher
- Peter Meechan (footballer) (1872–1915), Scottish professional footballer
