= Warren Barker =

American composer, arranger, and conductor

- Born: April 16, 1923; Oakland, California, U.S.
- Died: August 3, 2006 (aged 83); Greenville, South Carolina, U.S.

Warren E. Barker (April 16, 1923 - August 3, 2006) was an American composer, arranger, and conductor known for his work in film, radio, and television, as well as for original concert band and symphonic compositions.

== Early life and education ==
Barker was born in Oakland, California on April 16, 1923. His primary instrument was the saxophone, and he also played piano and trumpet in school. He attended the University of California, Los Angeles as a music major and continued his composition studies with the Italian-born composer Mario Castelnuovo-Tedesco and the Luxembourgian composer and conductor Henri Pensis, founder of the Luxembourg Philharmonic Orchestra.

== World War II service ==
In 1943, Barker joined the United States Army Air Forces and served as first sergeant of a 28-piece military band, coordinating musical activities. His duties included composing and arranging for radio programs, stage shows, war bond tours, and other military functions.

== Hollywood career ==
After his discharge from the army in 1946, Barker became chief arranger for the Hollywood composer and conductor Carmen Dragon. At the age of 24 he was appointed chief arranger for the National Broadcasting Company's prime musical radio program, The Railroad Hour, a position he held for six years. Over the following two and a half decades he worked as a composer, arranger and conductor for 20th Century Fox, Columbia Pictures and Metro-Goldwyn-Mayer, primarily on their television productions, and was a member of the arranging staff for the 1969 film version of Hello, Dolly!.

== Television work ==
Barker scored more than thirty primetime television series during the 1950s and 1960s. At the end of the 1950s he served as musical director and conductor on the soundtrack album of 77 Sunset Strip, released by Warner Bros. Records, which became one of the best-known pop-jazz releases derived from a television series.

His most prominent television assignment was the ABC sitcom Bewitched, for which he served as composer-conductor for the show's full seven-season run from 1964 to 1972. He was hired for the series on the strength of his 1959 album A Musical Touch of Far Away Places, recorded with the actor William Holden using exotic instruments Holden had collected on his world travels; the show's producers thought the album's bell-and-tinkling sound palette matched the magical mood they were seeking for the series. The orchestral main-title arrangement that replaced the original Howard Greenfield and Jack Keller vocal version was Barker's, as was the xylophone motif that accompanies the title character's nose-twitch throughout the show.

In 1970, the National Academy of Television Arts and Sciences honoured Barker for his original music for the NBC series My World and Welcome to It, based on the writings of James Thurber. His other television credits include Sea Hunt, Daktari, The Flying Nun, Hawaiian Eye, I Spy, and Gunsmoke. For film, he composed the score for the early-1960s drama Strange Lovers and the 1965 MGM feature Zebra in the Kitchen, the latter featuring a title song recorded by The Standells.

== Recording career ==
With the Warren Barker Orchestra, Barker recorded and conducted for Warner Bros. Records and Capitol Records during the late 1950s and 1960s, producing a series of pop-instrumental and exotica-influenced albums, including A Musical Touch of Far Away Places (1959), Warren Barker Is In! (1961), and arrangements of music from television shows such as Hawaiian Eye (1959) and The King and I (1958). His pop-instrumental work resurfaced in the 1990s and 2000s on lounge music and "Bachelor's Den" compilations. Barker also worked as a recording arranger for Frank Sinatra in collaboration with the arranger Nelson Riddle, a long-time friend and colleague.

== Retirement, ranching, and concert band career ==
In 1971 Barker retired from Hollywood and went into the ranching business. In 1975 he was persuaded out of retirement by the Hal Leonard music publishing company to compose and arrange original works for concert bands and wind ensembles, beginning a second career that continued until shortly before his death. He received commissions from the United States Air Force Band, the Royal Australian Navy Band, the Northshore Concert Band, the Norwegian Army Staff Band, and a number of American university and military ensembles, and his works were also performed by the Hollywood Bowl Orchestra and the Cincinnati Pops Orchestra.

== Death ==
Barker died on August 3, 2006 in Greenville, South Carolina, aged 83.

== Selected works ==
=== Television scores ===
- 77 Sunset Strip (1958-1964)
- Hawaiian Eye (1959-1963)
- Sea Hunt (1958-1961)
- Bewitched (1964-1972)
- Daktari (1966-1969)
- My World and Welcome to It (1969-1970)
- The Flying Nun (1967-1970)

=== Concert band works ===
- Overture a la Russe
- Scherzo for Saxophone Quartet
- John Muir
- Henry O. Tanner
- Sequoyah
- Christopher Columbus
- Divertimento for Flutes

== Archives ==
The Warren Barker Papers, 1932-2001, are held by the American Heritage Center at the University of Wyoming and include music manuscripts, scores, parts, audio tapes of television themes and source music, correspondence, photographs and biographical material.
