= Sandvikens Ungdomskorps =

Amateur wind band in Bergen, Norway

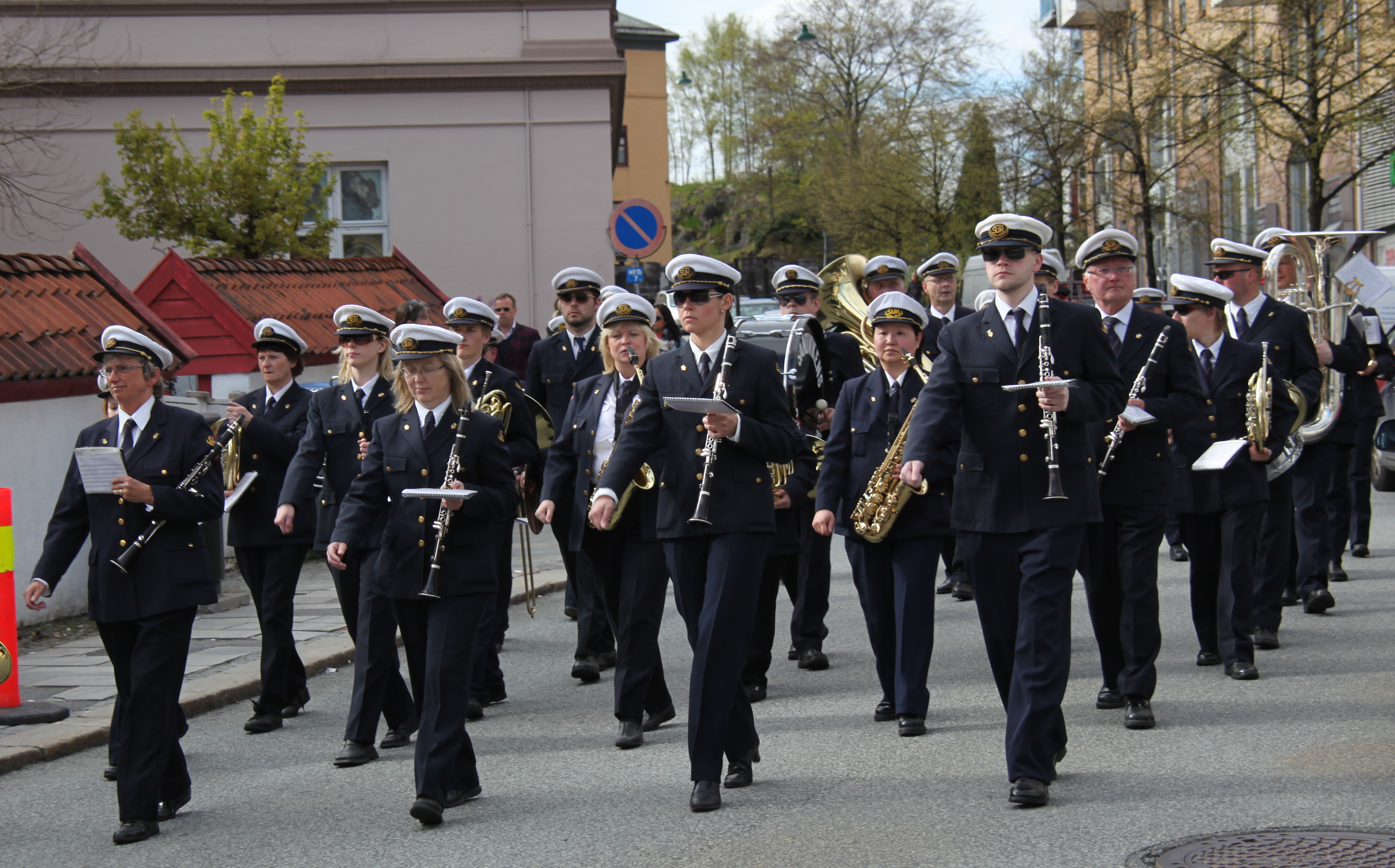
Sandvikens Ungdomskorps 13. mai 2010 Credit: Nina Aldin Thune

musical leaders 1994-2017

Sandvikens Ungdomskorps is an elite division amateur wind band in Bergen, Norway. The band was constituted on 1 July 1923 by a group of boys too old to play in the school band in Sandviken, Bergen. The school band is now gone, but Sandvikens Ungdomskorps has grown to be one of the leading wind bands in Norway.

The band is a member of Norges Musikkorps Forbund (the Norwegian band association, NMF), and participates each year in the Norwegian championships for wind bands in Trondheim. In 2011 the band won gold in the Norwegian championships for the first time, conducted by no:Tormod Flaten, marginally better than Dragefjellets Musikkorps. Read NRK's winner article here, NMF's winner article here, and BT's winner article here. The band also won 1st place in Jan-Am 2011 in Stavanger, in addition to the price for best soloist to Asbjørn Haukeland on marimba, and the audience reward the same year.

Sandvikens Ungdomskorps has a wide profile, is an active member of the community in Sandviken, marching the streets on 17 May (Norway's constitution day), participates each year in the national championship, holds a flea market each year, and holds social activities with its members.

The members come from all of Bergen, and ages range from youth's in school to ripe adults. The band usually show off their own soloists on concerts, but also have a history of playing with different musical legends in Norway.

Sandvikens Ungdomskorps has close ties to the Bow Corps in Bergen, especially to Dræggens Buekorps, and participates on celebrations of their foundation day and other events held by the Bow Corps. Sandvikens Ungdomskorps has also published a cd with the only complete collection of Bow Corps marches from Bergen, named Buekorpsmarsjene. In many years the band has held concerts in Grieghallen in the autumn, and is active in the cultural life in Bergen playing music and marching the streets. The Grieghallen concert in 2009 was about the best Bergen song, the winner was Utsikt fra Fløyen.

Two very popular groups in the band is Nikkersgjengen (Knickerbockersgang) and the bottle orchestra Bunnen er nådd (We've reached the bottom). Nikkersgjengen received in 1998 the prestigious "Jonnemannprisen" award. Nikkersgjengen still exists, and the bottle orchestra comes together when needed.

The band is always recruiting new players, and weighs the professionalism and commitment of their players before admission.

== Conductors ==
Most recently Thorgeir Thunestvedt has been conducting Sandvikens Ungdomskorps, with Ray Farr stepping in during the Norwegian Championships. The band uses various conductors during different projects, including Tormod Flaten, Bjørn Breistein, Helge Haukås, Bengt Florvåg, Ray Farr, Karl Ole Midtbø and Reid Gilje. The last years, the band has cooperated with the Grieg Academy, letting the conductor students conduct Sandvikens Ungdomskorps as part of their final exams.

== Repertoire ==
Sandvikens ungdomskorps varies the repertoire from year to year. Lately new music has been in focus but also the traditional and march pieces is played. On the national day and special occasions, the band always plays their own march piece Sandviksgutten where the band on occasions sing a verse:

Hør trompetsignaler klinge, Sandviksgutter i Giv Akt!
Vi musikken frem vil bringe og om korpset vårt stå vakt!
Stadig fremad vil vi vinne for de nye mål og nå, og i glans vår sak skal skinne.
Frem for S.U.K!

Translation

Hear the trumpet signals sound, Sandviken Boys at attention!
We will bring the music forward and stand guard over the band!
Ever forward, we will win and reach new goals, and proudly our cause will shine.
Forwards S.U.K!

== Merits ==
- 2022 - 9th place in 2nd division in the Norwegian championships for wind bands
- 2019 - 12th place in the 1st division in the Norwegian championships for wind bands
- 2018 - 9th place in the 1st division in the Norwegian championships for wind bands
- 2017 - 9th place in the elite division in the Norwegian championships for wind bands
- 12 March 2016 - 6th place in the elite division in the Norwegian championships for wind bands
- 21 November 2015 - 2nd place in Jan-Am
- 21 March 2015 - 3rd place in the elite division in the Norwegian championships for wind bands
- 22 November 2014 - 1st place in Jan-Am
- 5 April 2014 - 3rd place in the elite division in the Norwegian championships for wind bands
- 16 March 2013 - 4th place in the elite division in the Norwegian championships for wind bands
- 10 November 2012 - 1st place in Jan-Am
- 23 March 2012 - 3rd place in the elite division in the Norwegian championships for wind bands
- 12 November 2011 - 1st place in Jan-Am
- 9 April 2011 - 1st place in the elite division in the Norwegian championships for wind bands
- 20 March 2010 - 8th place in the elite division in the Norwegian championships for wind bands
- 28 March 2009 - 8th place in the elite division in the Norwegian championships for wind bands
- 8 March 2008 - 7th place in the elite division in the Norwegian championships for wind bands
- 24 March 2007 - 5th place in the elite division in the Norwegian championships for wind bands
- 1 April 2006 - 9th place in the elite division in the Norwegian championships for wind bands
- 12 March 2005 - 7th place in the elite division in the Norwegian championships for wind bands
- 27 March 2004 - 8th place in the elite division in the Norwegian championships for wind bands

== Publishings ==
- CD - Ka e’ det mot Bergen
- CD - Buekorpsmarsjene, 1988
- CD - Hilsen fra Bergen, 1991
- Paper - Sandvikens skolekorps 25-årsberetning : <1908-1933> og Sandvikens ungdomskorps 10-årsberetning <1923-1933> / Sandvikens skolekorps - Handelstrykkeriet, 1933
- Article - Litt om Sandvikens ungdomskorps (In: Sandvikens dag Sunday 23 May 1948, page. 9-10)
- Book - Gjerstad, J.: Hør trompetsignaler klinge : Sandvikens ungdomskorps 1923-1998. - Sandvikens ungdomskorps, 2001 ISBN 82-7128-315-4
- Performance - Norwegian championships 2008
- Performance - Norwegian championships 2009
