= Oliveira do Bairro =

- Municipality
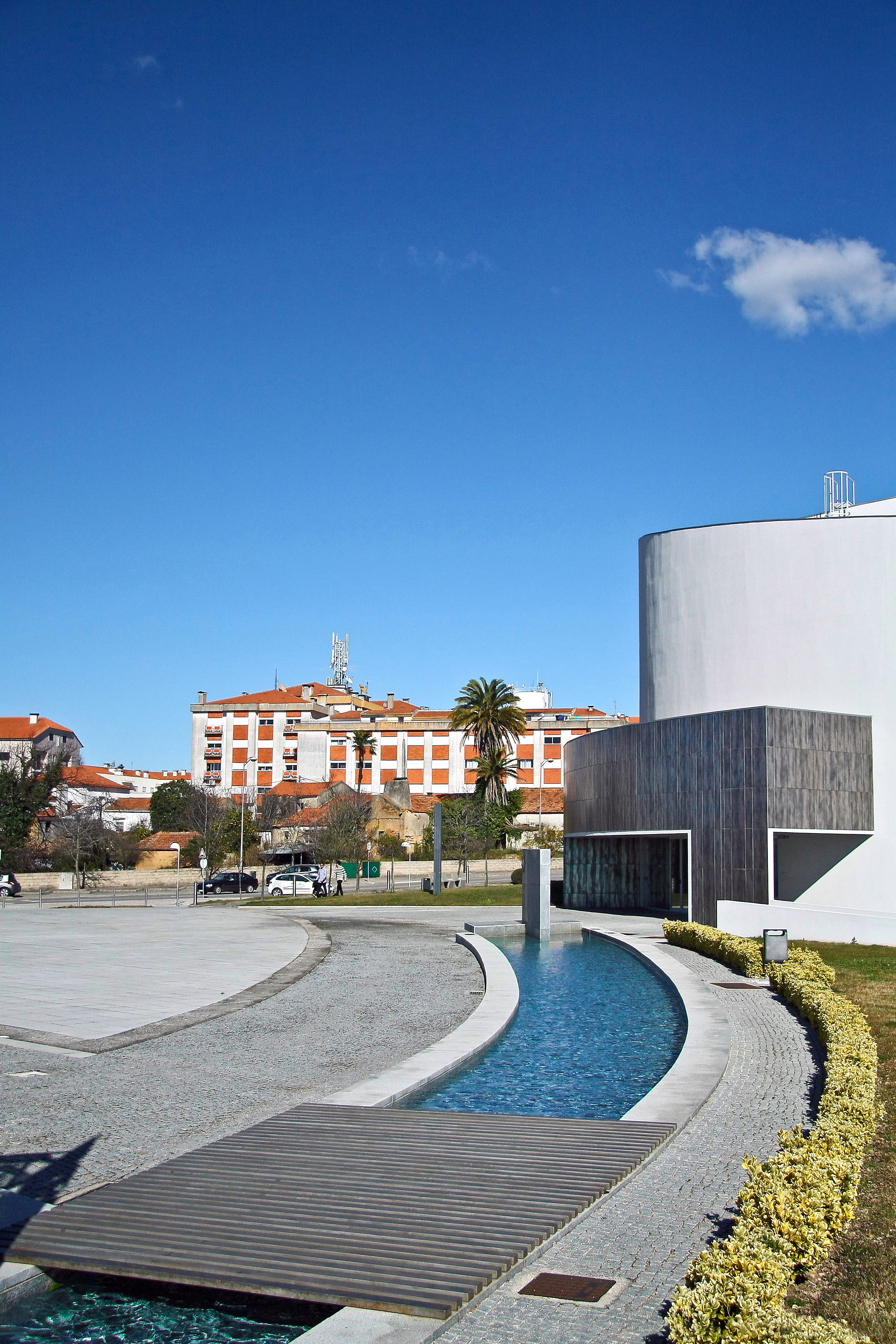

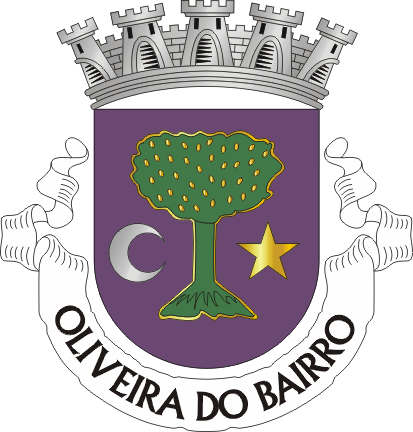
- Flag Coat of arms
- Interactive map of Oliveira do Bairro
- Coordinates: 40°31′N 8°30′W
- Country: Portugal
- Region: Centro
- Intermunic. comm.: Região de Aveiro
- District: Aveiro
- Parishes: 4

Government
  - President: Duarte Novo (CDS–PP)

Area
  - Total: 87.32 km^{2} (33.71 sq mi)

Population (2011)
  - Total: 23,028
  - Density: 263.7/km^{2} (683.0/sq mi)
- Time zone: UTC+00:00 (WET)
  - Summer (DST): UTC+01:00 (WEST)
- Local holiday: Ascension Day date varies
- Website: http://www.cm-olb.pt/

Oliveira do Bairro (Portuguese pronunciation: [ɔliˈvɐjɾɐ ðu ˈβajʁu]) is a town and a municipality in the district of Aveiro in Portugal. The population in 2011 was 47,729, in an area of 335.27 km^{2}. It had 16,994 eligible voters in 2006. The town itself had a population of 3,077 in 2001.

The municipality is in the Bairrada area. The present Mayor is Duarte Novo. The municipal holiday is Ascension Day.

== Demographics ==
Inhabitants (1801–2011)
1801	1849	1900	1930	1960	1981	1991	2001	2004	2011
1939	5086	9540	14362	16699	17517	18660	21164	22365	23028

== Parishes ==
Administratively, the municipality is divided into 4 civil parishes (freguesias):

- Bustos, Troviscal e Mamarrosa
- Oiã
- Oliveira do Bairro
- Palhaça

== Cultural institutions ==
- União Filarmónica do Troviscal, Troviscal - Aveiro, conducted by André Granjo

== Twinning cities ==
Oliveira do Bairro is twinned with two cities:

Benguela, Angola and
Lamballe, France

== Notable people ==
- Ilda Figueiredo (born 1948 in Troviscal, Oliveira do Bairro) a Portuguese politician and Member of the European Parliament for the Portuguese Communist Party
- João Tomás (born 1975) a Portuguese retired footballer with 378 club caps and 4 for Portugal
