= Birmingham Symphonic Winds =

Birmingham Symphonic Winds (BSW) is a UK-based amateur wind orchestra in the style of the Eastman Wind Ensemble.

BSW was established in 1992 with the aim of offering local players the opportunity to perform high-quality wind repertoire and contemporary compositions. It promotes its own themed concert series at the CBSO Centre, Birmingham, home to the City of Birmingham Symphony Orchestra, and other venues across the Midlands and has performed numerous UK and world premieres, including works by Samuel Hazo, Philip Sparke, Martin Ellerby, Kenneth Hesketh and Guy Woolfenden.

BSW has performed at UK and international music festivals, including the National Concert Band Festival, the World Association of Symphonic Bands and Ensembles (WASBE) conference in Schladming, Austria and the 4th International Wind Band Festival in Strasbourg. BSW was the first ever UK ensemble to perform at the Midwest Clinic, Chicago in December 2003. BSW also performed at the WASBE Conference in Killarney, Ireland in July 2007 and performed with the Hong Kong Youth Symphonic Band at the Kwai Tsing Theatre in Hong Kong in 2014. BSW was the winner of the Classic FM Big Platinum Performance in 2022.
