= Sydney Wind Symphony =

Australian wind band based in Sydney

- Concert band
- Short name: SWS
- Former name: City of Sydney Youth Festival Concert Band; City of Sydney Bicentennial Concert Band; City of Sydney Concert Band; City of Sydney Wind Ensemble
- Founded: 1985 (40 years ago)
- Location: North Sydney, New South Wales, Australia
- Concert hall: Astra Theatre, Queenwood School for Girls
- Principal conductor: Fiona Lucas
- Website: www.sydneywindsymphony.com.au

Sydney Wind Symphony (SWS) is one of the leading amateur wind ensembles in the Sydney metropolitan region. It is the successor of various incarnations of the City of Sydney band formed from 1985 onwards – City of Sydney Youth Concert Band, City of Sydney Bicentennial Concert Band, The City of Sydney Concert Band, and City of Sydney Wind Ensemble.

== History ==
=== City of Sydney Youth Festival Concert Band ===
In 1984, Victor Grieve approached the Sydney City Council with a view to forming a Youth Band to celebrate the International Youth Year, under the patronage and sponsorship of the City Council. The City of Sydney Youth Concert Band was formed in February of that year, 65 players being selected from the Sydney Metropolitan area. During 1984 the band performed with great distinction performing at the Sydney Town Hall and the Sydney Opera House.

=== City of Sydney Bicentennial Concert Band ===
In 1986, having forged a unique link to the City of Sydney and patronage of the Lord Mayor of Sydney, Victor Grieve sought and was given approval by the Sydney Council that the band should continue on at the end of International Year of Youth as the "City of Sydney Bicentennial Concert Band" with the aim of performing for events leading up to Australia's 200th birthday. New auditions were held, and from 350 applicants, 70 players were selected. The group have given many concerts, including Sydney Town Hall, the Sydney Opera House, Darling Harbour and all over the state of New South Wales. The objectives or aim of the band were to give public performances in the months leading up to and during Bicentennial Year (1988). The band was proud to visit the sister city of Portsmouth, England in 1987 and to take part in the British Celebrations commemorating the sailing of the First Fleet to Australia in 1787 and performed with distinction in the presence of Her Majesty the Queen and the Duke of Edinburgh, as part of a hectic two week tour of the United Kingdom and France. The Band also travelled to sister city San Francisco (USA), Calgary (Canada) and Nagoya (Japan).

=== City of Sydney Concert Band ===
In 1989, the City of Sydney Bicentennial Concert Band had completed its charter on 31st December 1988 and an interested group of parents and friends of the band prepared a new submission to they Sydney council for a permanent concert and marching band to represent the City. The proposal was accepted and the Council enthusiastically endorsed the re-formation of City of Sydney Bicentennial Concert Band as the City of Sydney Concert Band as its permanent successor. One of Australia's most distinguished band conductors, former Director of Music of the Royal Australian Air Force Squadron Leader (Ret'd) Michael Butcher, was appointed the Director of Music.

During the first quarter of 1992 the band has enjoyed its most active period since the height of the Bicentennial Celebrations and was described as "the musical voice of our city" by Alderman Frank Sartor, Lord Mayor of Sydney, was known as The City of Sydney Concert Band and represented the city at a number of civic functions, including the Lord Mayor's charity concert, the arrival and departure of the Queen Elizabeth 2, the arrival of Her Majesty Queen Elizabeth II and Prince Philip, Duke of Edinburgh at Sydney Town Hall and the 60th Anniversary of the Sydney Harbour Bridge. In 1992 it undertook a three-week European tour which included an appearance at World Expo '92 in Seville.

=== City of Sydney Wind Ensemble ===
In 1999, the concert band changed its name to the City of Sydney Wind Ensemble and continued, this time, without the sponsorship of the Council of the City of Sydney.

=== Sydney Wind Symphony ===
Since 2008 the ensemble has been known as Sydney Wind Symphony.

== Competitions ==
Sydney Wind Symphony has competed regularly in the A Grade Open Concert Band Competition and was declared National Champion in 2000 and 2004, New South Wales State Champion in 2003 and 2005 and was placed second in both the National and State competitions in 2009.

== Notable performances ==
Performances of note include:

- World Expo '92 Seville
- Australia National Day celebrations in 1992
- Visit of Her Majesty Queen Elizabeth II and Prince Philip, Duke of Edinburgh
- Host City announcement for the 2000 Olympic Games
- Centenary of Federation Parade
- Lord Mayor's Charity Concert
- 60th Anniversary of the Sydney Harbour Bridge
- Various Australia Day Celebrations, World Cup matches and many more

== Concert tours ==
- UK and France, 1987
- Japan
- Canada
- USA
- Nagoya, Japan, 1990
- Ayers Rock, Northern Territory, Australia, 1991
- Europe, 1992
- Eastern Europe, 1997

== Musical directors ==
- Victor Grieve, City of Sydney Youth Concert Band
- Victor Grieve, City of Sydney Bicentennial Band
- Harold Pollard, assistant conductor, City of Sydney Bicentennial Band
- Michael Butcher, City of Sydney Concert Band, 1989–1999
- John Buckley, The City of Sydney Wind Ensemble, 2000
- Steve Hillinger, The City of Sydney Wind Ensemble, 2001–2006
- John Buckley, Sydney Wind Symphony, 2007–2012
- Lloyd Edge, Sydney Wind Symphony, (guest musical director) 2012
- Mark Brown, Sydney Wind Symphony, (guest musical director) 2012
- Mark Brown, Sydney Wind Symphony, 2013–present
