= Samuel Hazo (composer) =

American composer (born 1966)

Samuel Robert Hazo (born 1966) is an American composer, primarily of music for concert band.

== Biography ==
Hazo is the son of the poet and playwright Samuel John Hazo and his wife, Mary Anne. After elementary and secondary schooling in the Upper St. Clair School District, he gained a bachelor's degree in music education and a master's in education from Duquesne University. He taught music in the Upper St. Clair School District. Hazo retired from teaching in 2006. He lives in Pittsburgh, Pennsylvania with his wife and children.

== Career ==
Hazo began composing aged 30, and had his first composition published aged 35. In 2001, he received the National Band Association Merrill Jones Award for the best high school wind symphony composition. In 2003, he received the William D. Revelli Composition Award for his piece "Perthshire Majesty". This was the first time in the associations' forty-four year history that one person had won both composition awards.

He has composed for the professional, university and public school levels in addition to writing original scores for television, radio and the stage. His original symphonic compositions include performances with actors Brooke Shields, James Earl Jones, and Richard Kiley. Most recently, Mr. Hazo was asked by the Newtown School District to compose the memorial for the children and women who were lost in the tragedy at their Sandy Hook Elementary School. The result was a major work for Choir, Orchestra and Wind Band combined titled "Glorificare". It was premiered in May 2013 by the Hartford Symphony Orchestra and VOCE Singers performing side-by-side with the Newtown High School musicians. Mr. Hazo also composed "Bridges", which he was requested to write by Virginia Tech University following their tragic shootings. In 2012, two of Hazo's compositions were performed at the 2012 Summer Olympics. His piece "Mountain Thyme" was an Honorable Mention for the 2013 College Band Directors National Association Composition Contest.

His compositions have been performed and recorded worldwide, including performances by the Tokyo Kosei Wind Orchestra, the Birmingham Symphonic Winds (UK) and the Klavier Wind Project's recordings with Eugene Migliaro Corporon. Additionally, numerous titles of Hazo's works are included in the series "Teaching Music Through Performance in Band". He has served as composer-in-residence at Craig Kirchhoff's University of Minnesota Conducting Symposium and has also lectured on music and music education at universities and high schools internationally. He is a member of ASCAP and recipient of multiple ASCAPlus Awards. Jack Stamp, in his final year of teaching at Indiana University of Pennsylvania, produced a recorded compilation of Hazo's music.

He has been invited to guest conduct over 70 university ensembles and half of the All-State bands in America. Mr. Hazo was twice named “Teacher of Distinction” by the southwestern Pennsylvania Teachers’ Excellence Foundation. He served on the Board of Governors of Duquesne University and was awarded as Duquesne's Outstanding Graduate in Music Education. Mr. Hazo serves as a lecturer and clinician for Hal Leonard.

== Selected composed works ==
- Alto Saxophone Concerto
- Arabesque (Commissioned by the Indiana Bandmasters' Association for the 2008 All-State Honor Band)
- Ascend (Movement III of Georgian Suite)]
- As Winds Dance
- Autumn on White Lake (Commissioned by Lakeland High School Wind Ensemble in 2008)
- Blessings
- Blue and Green Music (Based on the painting by Georgia O'Keeffe)
- Books with Blank Pages: Clarinet Concerto (Commissioned by Robinson High School in memory of John "Jack" Stewart and Laura Onwudinanti)
- Bridges (Commissioned by Virginia Tech in memory of the victims of the Virginia Tech Massacre in 2007)
- Chorus Angelorum (Commissioned by Hereford High School in memory of Joey and Audrey Baseman)
- Diamond Fanfare
- Drums of the Saamis
- Each Time You Tell Their Story (Written to celebrate the 100th anniversary of the New Mexico Military Institute's band program, 2003)
- Echoes
- Enchanted Spaces
- Everything Beautiful
- Exultaté
- Fantasy on a Japanese Folk Song
- For Heaven And The Future
- From Gold
- ...GO
- In Flight
- In Heaven's Air
- Jubilateo (Commissioned February 2012 by the Calgary Stampede Showband)
- Keltic Variations
- Minuet
- Mountain Thyme
- Novo Lenio
- Olympiada
- Our Kingsland Spring (Movement I of Georgian Suite)
- Our Yesterdays Lengthen Like Shadows (Commissioned by the South Carolina Band Director's Association for the 2008 All-State Honor Band)
- Parkour (Commissioned by the East Winds Symphonic Band, premiered November 6, 2011)
- 2003 - Perthshire Majesty — winner of the 2003 National Band Association William D. Rivelli Memorial Composition Contest
- Psalm 42
- The Quest
- Ride
- Rising Star
- Rivers (Movement II of Georgian Suite)
- Rush (Noted in the score by Hazo to be Ride Part II)
- Seconds Out (Commissioned by Canon McMillan Middle School for the Symphonic Band in 2012)
- Sevens
- Síoraí September (Commissioned by the Notre Dame Concert Band, premiered May 11, 2010 at Carnegie Hall)
- Sky is Waiting (2006)
- Sòlas Ané (Yesterday's Joy)
- Southern Hymn (Commissioned by Providence High School Wind Ensemble, Charlotte, NC in memory of Neil Rasmussen)
- Stella Maris (Commissioned by The Celia Cruz Bronx High School of Music and the friends and family of Marissa Alp). World Premier Performance conducted by Samuel Hazo, December 10, 2013, at the Lovinger Theatre, Lehman College, Bronx, NY.
- Their Blossoms Down
- Today is the Gift
- Three Concert Fanfares
- Three Minnesota Portraits: (Commissioned by the Edina High School Concert Band)
  - Movement One: Hennepin County Dawn (Shrouds of Snow)
  - Movement Two: Rest
  - Movement Three: Across the Halfpipe
- Themes from Handel's "Water Music"
- Themes from Mozart's "Eine Kleine Nachtmusick"
- Voices of the Sky
- Whisper to Their Souls (based on Greensleeves) (Commissioned by the Eastside High School Band, in Covington, GA, in memory of their director's father. Thomas S. Fowler passed away on Christmas Eve, 2004, after serving as Santa Claus at Ross Park Mall in Pittsburgh, PA.)
