= James Barnes (composer) =

American composer (born 1949)

James Charles Barnes
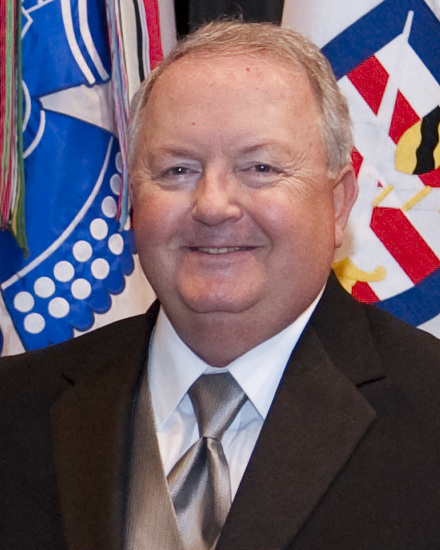
- Barnes in 2011
- Born: September 9, 1949 (age 76); Hobart, Oklahoma, U.S.
- Education: University of Kansas (B.M., M.M.)
- Occupations: Composer, tubist, professor
- Employer: University of Kansas (Emeritus Professor)
- Known for: Wind band compositions
- Notable work: Numerous wind ensemble works performed internationally
- Awards: American Bandmasters Association Ostwald Award (twice)

James Charles Barnes (born September 9, 1949 in Hobart, Oklahoma, U.S.) is an American composer.

== Life and career ==
Barnes studied composition and music theory at the University of Kansas, earning a Bachelor of Music in 1974, and Master of Music in 1975. He studied conducting privately with Zuohuang Chen. In 1977 he joined the faculty at the University of Kansas as professor of music theory and composition. He retired in August 2015, but retains his emeritus status at KU.

Barnes is also a tubist and has performed with numerous professional organizations in the United States.

His numerous compositions are frequently played in America, Europe, Japan, Taiwan and Australia. The Japanese concert band Tokyo Kosei Wind Orchestra has produced 3 CDs to date with works of James Barnes.

He has twice received the American Bandmasters Association Ostwald Award for contemporary wind band music.

== Works ==
=== Works for concert band ===
- A Solemn Prelude for Symphonic Band, Op. 114
- A Light in the Wilderness
- A Very American Overture, Op. 93
- All Pleasant Things - commissioned by the Northshore Concert Band
- Alvamar Overture, Op. 45
- Appalachian Overture, Op. 51
- Arioso For Symphonic Band
- Autumn Soliloquy for Oboe and Concert Band
- Beautiful Oregon
- Breckenridge
- Brookshire Suite
- Caribbean Hideaway
- Carnaval in São Paulo
- Centennial Celebration Overture
- Century Tower Overture
- Chorale and Jubiloso
- Chorale Prelude on a German Folk Tune, Op. 61
- Citadel (2015)
- Credo (2016)
- Concerto for Tuba and Wind Band
- Crossgate
- Dance Variants - commissioned by the Honolulu Wind Ensemble
- Danza Sinfonica
- Desperate Pursuit
- Dexter Park Celebration (2017)
- Dream Journey (a Tone Poem for Symphonic Band), Op. 98
- Dreamers...
- Doctor Who
- Duo Concertante, Op. 74
- Eagle Crest
- Eagle Bend Overture for Band
- Eisenhower Centennial March
- Fanfare and Capriccio
- Fanfares and Alleluias
- Fantasy Variations on a Theme by Nicolo Paganini (1988)
- Festival Concert March
- Festive Music for Singapore
- Foxfire Overture for Symphonic Band, Op. 111
- German Folk Tune
- Golden Brass
- Golden Festival Overture, Op. 95
- Heatherwood Portrait
- High Plains Overture
- Hobart Centennial March
- Hunter Park
- Inspiration Point
- Inventions On Marching Songs
- Invocation and Toccata
- Impressions of Japan
- Jubilation Overture
- Legend
- Lonely Beach Normandy 1944
- Long Gray Line
- Maracas from Caracas
- March Kawasaki
- Meadowlark, A Pastorale
- Medicine Lodge
- Mojaves Claves
- Music from "Girl Crazy" by George Gershwin
- Nulli Secundus March
- Omaggio
- Pagan Dances
  1. Ritual
  2. Mystics
  3. The Master of the Sword
- Poetic Intermezzo
- Rapscallion
- Rhapsodic Essay; Gathering of Eagles
- Riverfest
- Romanza
- Scenes of the Aztecs
- Spitfire Overture
- Stone Meadows
- Sunflower Saga
- Symphonic Essay, Op. 133
- Symphonic Overture, Op. 80
- The Old Guard
- The Pershing Rifles
- The Silver Gazebo
- The Texans
- Toccata Fantastica
- Torch Dance
- Trailridge Saga
- Trail of Tears
- Tribute, Op. 134
- Trumpets and Drums
- Twin Oaks Overture for Band
- Valor
- Variations on a Moravian Hymn
- Visions Macabres
- Westport Overture
- Westridge Overture
- Wild Blue Yonder
- Wildwood Overture
- Yama Midori (Green Mountains)
- Yorkshire Ballad

==== Symphonies ====
- First Symphony, Op. 35
  1. Allegro Vivo
  2. Lento
  3. Scherzo
  4. Passacaglia
- Second Symphony, Op. 44
  1. Elegia
  2. Variazioni Interrotte
  3. Finale
- Third Symphony - "The Tragic", Op. 89 [MAJOR WORKS]
  1. Lento. Allegro ritmico
  2. Scherzo
  3. Fantasia - Mesto (for Natalie)
  4. Finale - Allegro giocoso
- Fourth Symphony – "Yellowstone Portraits", Op. 103b
  1. Dawn on the Yellowstone River
  2. Pronghorn Scherzo
  3. Inspiration Point (Tower Falls)
- Fifth Symphony "Phoenix", Op. 110
  1. Eulogy
  2. Scherzo
  3. Reverie
  4. Jubilation
- Sixth Symphony, Op. 130 (written for the Lake Braddock High School Symphonic Band)
  1. Andante, ma non troppo
  2. Adagio
  3. Allegro energico
- Seventh Symphony – "Symphonic Requiem", Op. 135
  1. Prologue - The Hornet's Nest (Shiloh, April 1862)
  2. Marye's Heights (Fredericksburg, December 1862)
  3. Longstreet's Assault (The Third Day at Gettysburg, July 1863)
  4. Apotheosis (Appomattox, 1865)
- Eighth Symphony – "for Wangen", Op. 148 (written for the 1200 anniversary of Wangen im Allgäu in 2015, premiere on March 20, 2015 in Wangen im Allgäu by Stadtkapelle Wangen conducted by James Barnes.)
- Ninth Symphony – "Elegy', Op. 160 (commissioned by a consortium of twenty-one college bands, including the University of North Texas Symphonic Band, community bands, professional bands and individuals to help mark the 70th birthday of the composer.)
  1. Elegy
  2. Scherzo
  3. Night Music
  4. Finale
