= Queensland Wind Orchestra =

The Queensland Wind Orchestra
- Concert band
- Short name: QWO
- Founded: 2004
- Location: Brisbane, Australia
- Principal conductor: David Law
- Website: qwo.org.au

The Queensland Wind Orchestra is a wind ensemble based in Brisbane, Australia. Established in 2004, it performs a series of public performances each year in and around Brisbane.

The group works with a variety of professional conductors and soloists and strives to continually bring new and exciting wind band music to its audiences.

The ensemble utilises flexible instrumentation and the concept of one player per part, in line with Frederick Fennell's 1952 concept of the Eastman Wind Ensemble.

The orchestra is a non-profit incorporated association managed by an elected committee of its performing members and is a community-based ensemble. It requires all players to audition for entry to the group and maintains a high standard of musicianship. The 40 to 45 members include musicians from many backgrounds, including medicine, science, nursing, engineering, law and others, as well as university music students, graduates and teachers.

== See also ==
- Music of Brisbane
