= Concert band =

Performing ensemble

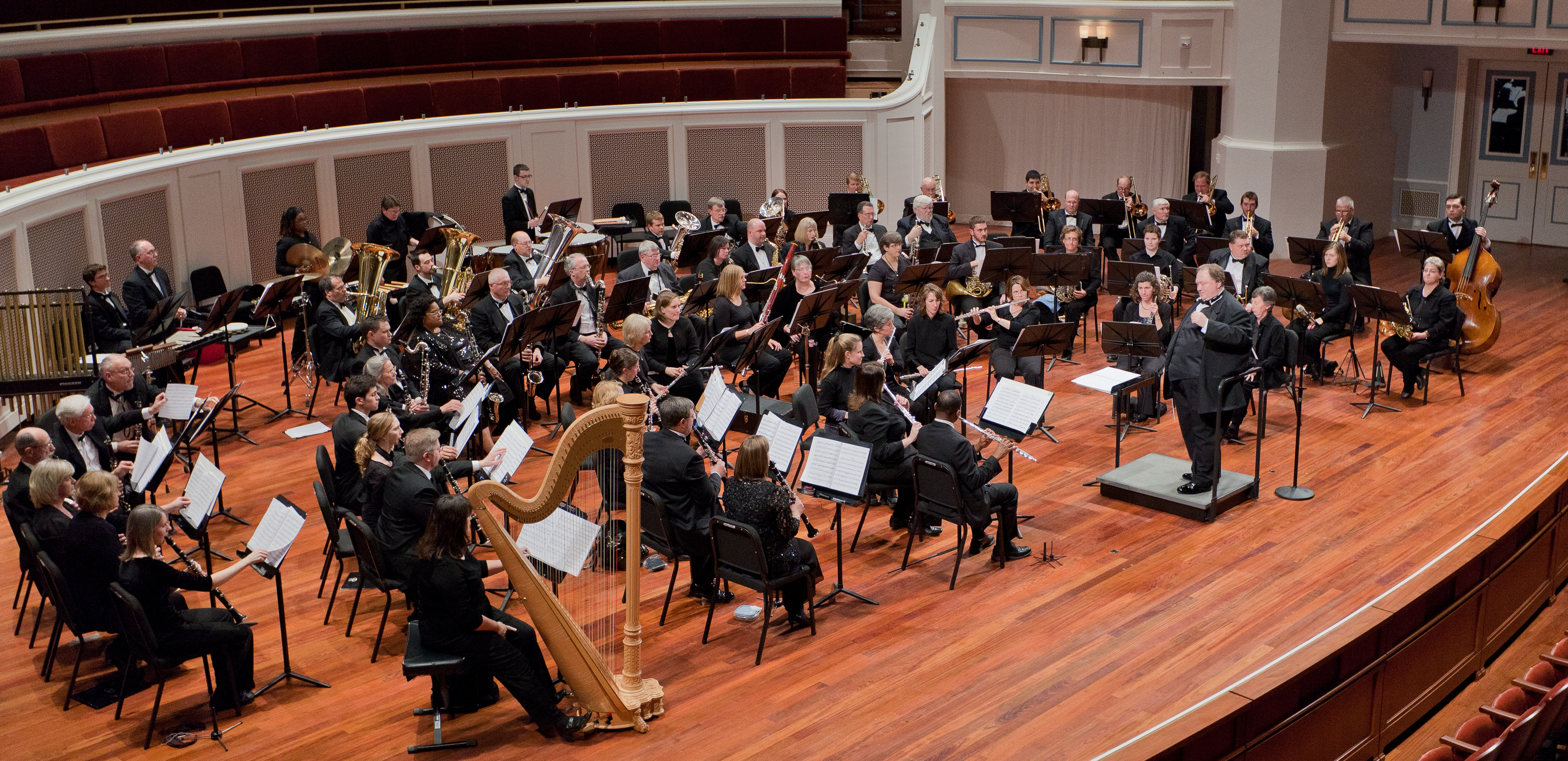
A full concert band—Indiana Wind Symphony in concert, 2014

A concert band, also referred to as wind band, wind ensemble, wind symphony, wind orchestra, symphonic band, symphonic winds, or symphonic wind ensemble, is a performing ensemble consisting of members of the woodwind, brass, and percussion families of instruments,, but no string instruments, which is the key differentiator from an orchestra. Concert bands do occasionally include additional, non-traditional instruments such as the piano, double bass, and harp, or electrified instruments such as synthesizer, electric guitar, and bass guitar.

Concert band music generally includes original wind compositions, concert marches, transcriptions of orchestral arrangements, light music, and popular music. Though the concert band does have similar instrumentation to the marching band, a marching band's main purpose is to perform while marching. In contrast, a concert band usually performs as a stationary ensemble, though European ensembles often do both.

== Origins ==
The origins of concert band can be traced back to the French Revolution, in which large bands would often gather for patriotic festivals and celebrations. These bands would play popular music that would immediately captivate the public's attention. Throughout the French Revolution, however, serious composers were often not interested in composing music for bands; this was due in large part to the instrumentation. Concert bands were (and still are) not standardized in their required type and number of instruments, making it nearly impossible to write the correct number of parts for the correct types of instruments. The quality of instruments also impacted composers' unwillingness to compose music for concert band. Wind instruments at that time were often difficult to play in tune and had difficulty in switching pitch and rhythm fast enough. This in turn influenced bands to stick with pieces that were transposed from orchestral movements and arrangements, something that has carried into the modern day.

During the 19th century, large ensembles of wind and percussion instruments in the British and American traditions existed mainly in the form of the military band for ceremonial and festive occasions, and the works performed consisted mostly of marches. The only time wind bands were used in a concert setting comparable to that of a symphony orchestra was when transcriptions of orchestral or operatic pieces were arranged and performed, as there were comparatively few original concert works for a large wind ensemble.

It was not until the early 20th century that composers began writing works for concert band. Concert band composers of this time were frustrated at the lack of quality music for bands, and as such, began writing and performing pieces to remedy this. One of the first and most important original works for concert band, First Suite for Band by Gustav Holst, was written in 1909. Other composers of this time period include Ralph Vaughan Williams, Richard Wagner, and Aaron Copland.

=== Instrumentation ===
Before the 1950s, wind ensembles included various combinations of instruments. The modern "standard" instrumentation of the wind ensemble was more or less established by Frederick Fennell at Eastman School of Music as the Eastman Wind Ensemble in 1952 after the model of the orchestra: a pool of players from which a composer can select in order to create different sonorities. According to Fennell, the wind ensemble was not revolutionary, but developed naturally out of the music.

== Concert band organizations ==
The British Association of Symphonic Bands and Wind Ensembles (BASBWE) has been a key organisation in the development and promotion of wind, brass, and symphonic band music in the United Kingdom, supporting performers, composers, and educational initiatives within the concert band community.

== Bands today ==
=== Military bands ===
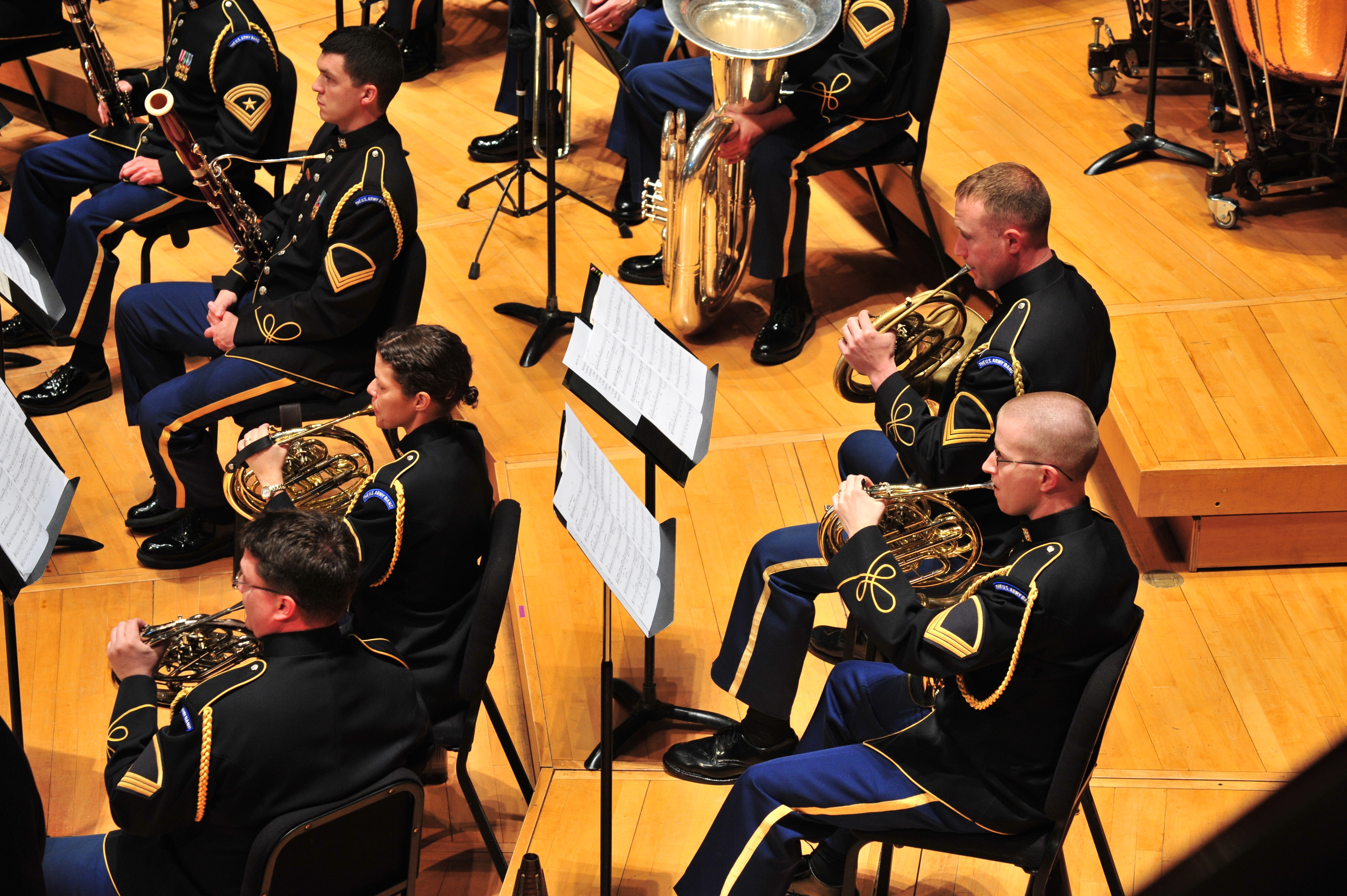
A military band—The United States Army Band

A military band is a group of personnel that performs musical duties for military functions, usually for the armed forces. A typical military band consists mostly of wind and percussion instruments. The conductor of a band commonly bears the title of Bandmaster or Director of Music. Ottoman military bands are thought to be the oldest variety of military marching band in the world, dating from the 13th century.

Military bands were originally used to control troops on the battlefield, by using instruments such as drums, bugles, and fifes among others. As communication systems during war became more advanced, the use of instruments on the battlefield as signaling devices fell out of use. From then on, military bands would fulfill a ceremonial role, entertaining troops and playing for the community. As its role shifted so too did its instrumentation. A wider range of instruments was employed to play transcriptions of orchestral works, the bulk of the early wind band repertoire. These military bands evolved into the modern drum and bugle corps and helped to spread the idea of a concert band. A modern military will often have multiple types of bands (e.g. the United States Marine Corps has both a drum and bugle corps and wind ensemble).

=== Professional bands ===
Professional concert bands not associated with the military appear across the globe, particularly in developed countries. However, most do not offer full-time positions. The competition to make it into one of these concert bands is incredibly high and the ratio of performers to entrants is narrowly small. Examples of professional non-military concert bands include:

- Dallas Wind Symphony, led by Jerry Junkin
- San Diego Winds, led for many years by Gregg Hanson
- Tokyo Kosei Wind Orchestra, led for many years by Frederick Fennell, and currently conducted by Takeshi Ooi
- Osaka Shion Wind Orchestra
- Royal Hawaiian Band, created by royal decree in 1836 by King Kamehameha III

=== Community bands ===
A community band is a concert band or brass band ensemble composed of volunteer (non-paid) amateur musicians in a particular geographic area. It may be sponsored by the local (municipal) government or self-supporting. These groups rehearse regularly and perform at least once a year. Some bands are also marching bands, participating in parades and other outdoor events. Although they are volunteer musical organizations, community bands may employ an artistic director (conductor) or various operational staff.

The rise of the community band can partially be attributed to industrialization. As the instruments became easier to manufacture, their availability greatly increased. This meant that many amateurs could now form a town band, their arrangements typically consisting of patriotic tunes, marches, and popular music. The American Civil War marked a turning point in the American community band where many military musicians, either stemming from amateur or professional backgrounds, sought to create their own community band after the war's conclusion. The large number of bands created during this era led to a "Golden Age of Bands", spearheaded by conductors such as John Philip Sousa and Patrick Gilmore. The new forms of twentieth-century entertainment, namely the radio and phonograph, led to decline in community bands. This led to instrument manufacturers, who previously had marketed to the community bands, to focus on schools. The expansion of school music programs would eventually help restore interest in the community band as graduates sought to play in a band together again.

Notable community bands include:

U.S.A.

- The American Band, Providence, Rhode Island, conducted by Brian Cardany
- Allentown Band, the oldest American civilian band, Allentown, Pennsylvania, conducted by Ronald Demkee
- Brooklyn Wind Symphony, Brooklyn, NY, conducted by Jeff W. Ball
- Lesbian & Gay Big Apple Corps, New York, New York, conducted by Kelly Watkins
- Northshore Concert Band, Evanston, Illinois, conducted by Mallory Thompson
- Salt Lake Symphonic Winds, Salt Lake City, Utah, conducted by Thomas P. Rohrer
- The TriBattery Pops, New York, NY, conducted by Tom Goodkind
- East Winds Symphonic Band, Pittsburgh, PA, conducted by Susan Sands

United Kingdom

- Birmingham Symphonic Winds, conducted by Keith Allen
- Newark and Sherwood Concert Band, Newark, Nottinghamshire, conducted by Colum J O'Shea
- North Cheshire Wind Orchestra, Warrington, Cheshire, conducted by Catherine Tackley
- Nottingham Concert Band, conducted by Robert Parker
- National Youth Wind Orchestra of Great Britain, various conductors

Canada

- Pacific Symphonic Wind Ensemble, Vancouver. David Branter, Resident Conductor and Acting Music Director

Australia

- North West Wind Ensemble, Sydney, James Brice, Musical Director
- Sydney Wind Symphony, Mark Brown, Musical Director
- Queensland Wind Orchestra, conducted by David Law

Norway

- Dragefjellets Musikkorps (Bergen Symphonic Band)
- Sandvikens Ungdomskorps, Bergen, conducted by Tormod Flaten and Bjørn Breistein

Portugal

- União Filarmónica do Troviscal, Troviscal—Aveiro, conducted by André Granjo

Finland

- Tikkurilan Soittokunta, Vantaa, conducted by Kimmo Nurmi

=== School bands ===
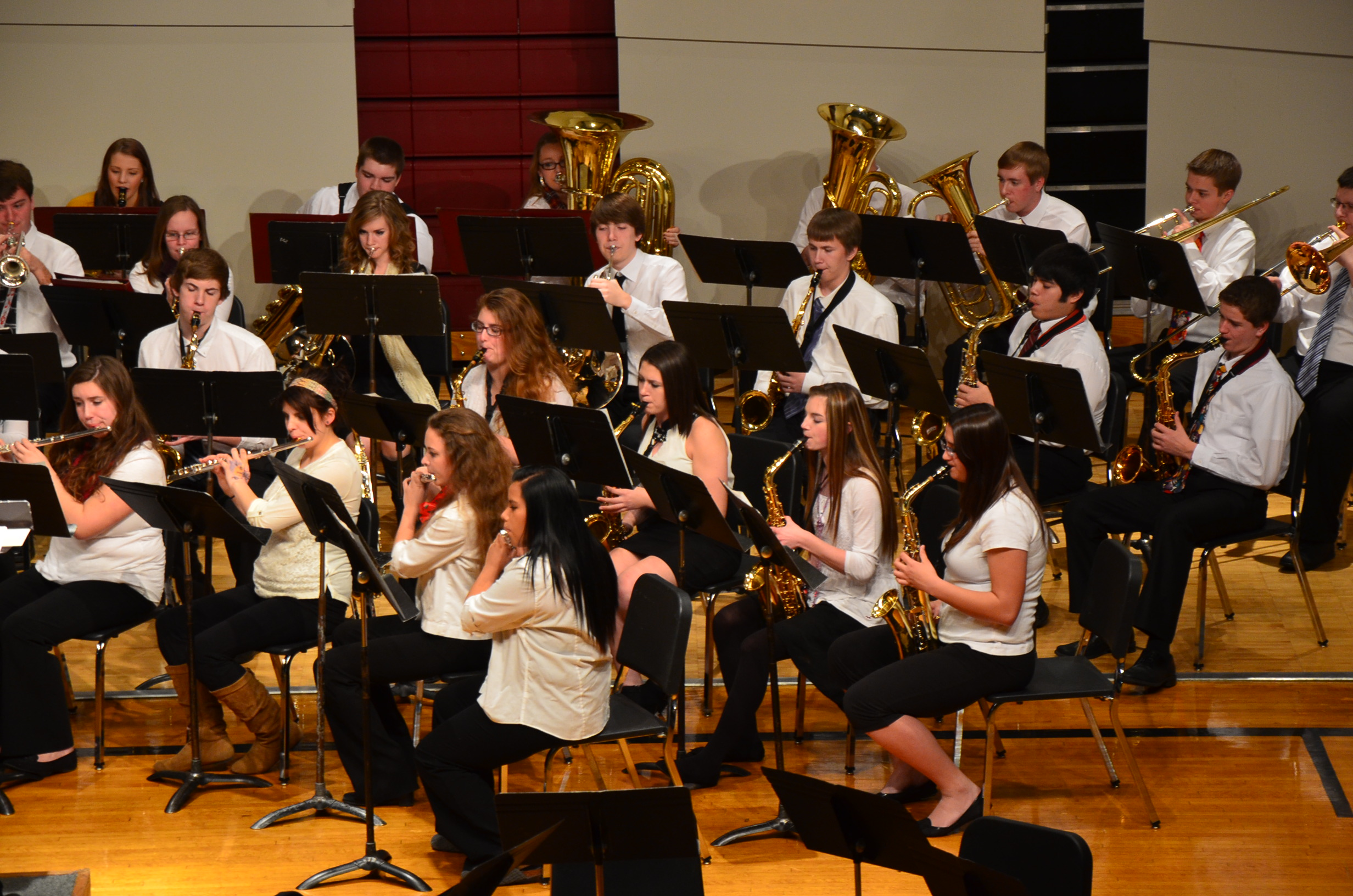
A high school concert band—BHS Band in performance, 2013

A school band is a group of student musicians who rehearse and perform instrumental music together. A school band is usually under the direction of one or more conductors (band directors). A school band consists of woodwind instruments, brass instruments and percussion instruments, although upper level bands may also have string basses or bass guitar.

In many traditional U.S. high schools, there are multiple band levels, distinguished by skill level or other factors. In such schools, an audition may be required to advance to further band levels, while the common level would be open to anyone. For example, in many U.S. high schools, "Concert Band" refers to the introductory level band, "Symphonic Band" is the title for the intermediate level band, and "Wind Ensemble" is the title for the advanced level band.

== Instrumentation ==
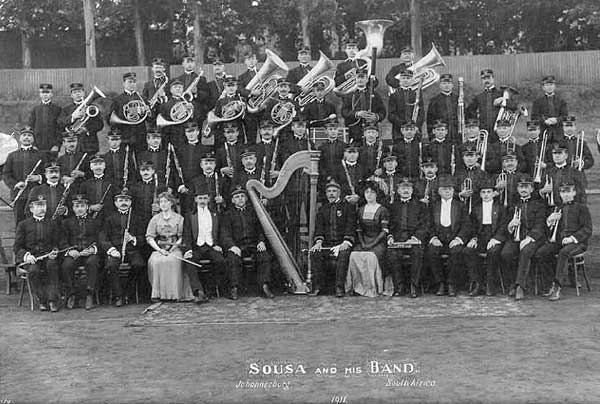
The early instrumentation of a large concert band (including violin soloist Nicoline Zedeler) is shown by the John Philip Sousa Band during their 1911 world tour.

Instrumentation for the wind band is not completely standardized; composers will frequently add or omit parts to their scores. Instruments and parts in parentheses in the list below are less common but are still often used; due to the fact that some bands are missing these instruments, important lines for these instruments are often cued into other parts.

Instrumentation for the songs differs depending on the type of ensemble. Middle school and high school bands frequently have more limited instrumentation and fewer parts (a few examples includes no oboe, no bassoon, or neither of the double reeds, only two horn parts instead of four, six, or even eight horns, and no mallet percussion). This is both to limit the difficulty for inexperienced players and because schools frequently do not have access to the less common instruments.

The standard concert band will have several players on each part depending on available personnel and the preference of the conductor, or the composer of a piece. A concert band can theoretically have as many as 200 members from a set that only contains 35 parts. The wind ensemble, on the other hand, will have very little doubling, if any; commonly, clarinets or flutes may be doubled, especially to handle any divisi passages, and other compositions will have one player per part, as dictated by the requirements of a specific composition by the composer. It is also common to see two tubas and two euphoniums and/or baritones playing the same part in a wind ensemble.

While largely made up of wind and percussion instruments, string instruments such as the string bass and concert harp are often scored for. The use of a harp in wind bands dates back to its inclusion in the professional and military bands of John Philip Sousa and Edwin Franko Goldman. Such bands would often contain the top harpists of the country, such as Winifred Bambrick, who was one of the first female instrumentalists to tour with the Sousa Band, and Victor Salvi, who played with the United States Navy Band. Notably, the United States Air Force Band scores for an entire section of cellos, a practice unique to the ensemble that dates back to the tenure of director George S. Howard.

Complicated percussion parts are common in concert band pieces, often requiring many percussionists. Many believe this is a major difference between the orchestra (which usually lacks a large battery of percussion) and the concert band. While in older transcriptions and concert works, the timpani were treated as their own section as in an orchestra, today in bands the timpani are considered a part of the percussion section. Consequently, if so needed, the timpani player often will double on other percussion instruments.

Contemporary compositions often call on players to use unusual instruments or effects. For example, several pieces call on the use of a siren while others will ask players to play recorders, whirly tubes, or to sing, hum, snap, clap or even crinkle sheets of paper. The wind band's diverse instrumentation and large number of players makes it a very flexible ensemble, capable of producing a variety of sonic effects.

Instrumentation for the bands has developed throughout different eras to become more efficient for the conditions that marching bands need to play in. For example, clarinets were found to be more suitable than the older oboes and became more widely used in the 18th century. More heavy and bulky instruments were replaced by trombones and cornets. In the 19th century, band instruments became highly developed as they started to add keys and valves that made certain ranges and notes on instruments easier to navigate and perform, which became a huge game changer for all musicians.

Woodwinds
Piccolos 1 (, 2)
Flutes 1, 2 (, 3)
(Alto flute) (Note: If called for, sometimes doubled by flute 2 or 3.)
(Bass flute)
Oboes 1, 2
(English horn) (Note: If called for, sometimes doubled by oboe 2.)
Bassoons 1, 2
(Contrabassoon) (Note: If called for, sometimes doubled by bassoon 2.)

(Sopranino clarinet in E♭)
Soprano clarinets in B♭ 1, 2, 3 (, 4, 5) (Note: Clarinets in A are sometimes used in professional concert bands, generally with a similar intent as symphonic orchestras for which B♭ or A clarinets are substituted to simplify a part's key signature.)
(Alto clarinet)
Bass clarinets 1 (, 2)
(Contra-alto clarinet/Contrabass clarinet) (often one of either, rarely both (Note: The contrabass clarinet part is usually provided in both B♭ and E♭ (contra-alto).))

(Soprano saxophone) (Note: In most cases, if a soprano saxophone is called for, it will replace the first alto saxophone part.)
Alto saxophones 1, 2 (Note: In very rare cases, only a single alto saxophone will be called for (e.g., Holst Band Suites). However, this practice has generally been discontinued with two alto saxophones almost always called for.)
Tenor saxophone
Baritone saxophone
(Bass saxophone)

Brass
Trumpets or cornets in B♭ 1, 2, 3 (, 4, 5, 6 (Note: Trumpet and cornet parts have often been considered interchangeable and are sometimes separated into 3 or 4 cornet parts and two trumpet parts; however, this practice is no longer used and is usually only seen in older (e.g. pre-1950) works and transcriptions. Trumpets are almost always in B♭ though models in E♭, D, and C were used commonly in the heyday of professional concert bands.))
(Piccolo trumpet (Note: If called for, sometimes doubled by trumpet 1.))
(Flugelhorns in B♭ 1 (, 2))
(Alto/tenor horns in E♭ 1, 2 (, 3, 4) (Note: In older works, there was often a middle brass part that could be played on either alto/tenor horn in E♭, French horn, or mellophone in F or E♭. There were usually copies of the parts in both F and E♭, for players to read off of based on the key of their instrument. Some modern publishers still include E♭ horn parts, which are merely duplicates of the F horn parts transposed to E♭. Alto/tenor horns are especially common in Britain, where they are often referred to as tenor horns.))
Horns in F 1, 2, 3, 4
Tenor trombones 1, 2 (, 3) (Note: Trombone parts will usually be divided into three parts with the first two parts (trombones 1, 2) played by tenor trombones and the third played by a bass trombone. However, in rare cases where a fourth part is required, either trombone 3 is a tenor and trombone 4 is a bass, or trombones 3 and 4 are both Bass. Scores will typically notate which one is preferred.)
Bass trombone
(Contrabass trombone)
(Alto trombone) (Note: If called for, sometimes doubled by trombone 1.)
Euphoniums (Note: The baritone/euphonium part is usually provided in both bass clef (concert pitch) and treble clef (in B♭, sounding a major 9th below written).) or baritone horns (Note: Baritones and euphoniums are often used interchangeably, though some works have distinct parts for the two instruments. Most of the time when a composer writes for "baritone", they are actually thinking of the larger-bore euphonium.) 1 (, 2)
Tubas

Keyboards
Piano
Celesta
Organ
Synthesizers

Percussion (Note: Percussion ensembles in concert bands can range from 2 to over 14 players. The type of percussion instruments used varies with the piece of music being played. Many percussion instruments from different cultures are used in a lot of contemporary concert band literature, especially in high school and college bands.)
- Examples of non-pitched choices
  Snare drums
  Bass drums
  Tenor drums
  Cymbals
  Tam-tams
  Triangles
  Tambourines
  Güiros
  Timbales
  Slide whistles
  Sleigh bells
  Wood blocks or temple blocks
  Tom-toms
  Bongos
  Congas
  Claves
  Vibraslaps
  Wind chimes
  Rain sticks
  Whips
  Maracas
  Finger cymbals
  Mark tree
  Bell tree
  Drum set
- Examples of pitched percussion instruments
  Timpani (Note: Timpani are always included in percussion parts; they have their own stave, notated in bass clef.)
  Glockenspiels
  Xylophones
  Marimba
  Crotales
  Vibraphone
  Chimes

Strings
String bass (Note: String bass parts are typically included in more advanced band pieces and larger ensemble instrumentation. The string bass part is sometimes replaced with an electric bass in certain contemporary band pieces. Some high schools and most college and professional bands will have a bassist in the ensemble.)
Harp (1, 2)
Cello
Electric guitar
Bass guitar

== Repertoire ==
=== Development of a repertoire ===
Until early in the 20th century, there was little music written specifically for the wind band, which led to an extensive repertoire of pieces transcribed from orchestral works, or arranged from other sources. However, as the wind band moved out of the sole domain of the military marching ensemble and into the concert hall, it has gained favor with composers, and now many works are being written specifically for the concert band and the wind ensemble. While today there are composers who write exclusively for band, many composers famous for their work in other genres have given their talents to composition for wind bands as well. This is especially true in Japan, where an enormous market can be found for wind band compositions, which is largely due to commissions by the All-Japan Band Association and leading professional ensembles such as the Tokyo Kosei Wind Orchestra and Osaka Municipal Symphonic Band, as well as the Kappa Kappa Psi and Tau Beta Sigma Commissioning Program, the longest-running commissioning series for wind band in the United States.

=== Prominent composers for concert band ===
==== Early to middle 20th century ====
Some of the most important people in establishing literature written specifically for concert band in the early and middle 20th century were:

- Robert Russell Bennett
- Hector Berlioz
- Aaron Copland
- Norman Dello Joio
- Vittorio Giannini
- Percy Grainger
- Morton Gould
- Howard Hanson
- Paul Hindemith
- Gustav Holst
- Gordon Jacob
- Boris Kozhevnikov
- Darius Milhaud
- Martin Mailman
- Nikolai Myaskovsky
- Vaclav Nelhybel
- Vincent Persichetti
- Alfred Reed
- H. Owen Reed
- Arnold Schoenberg
- Claude T. Smith
- John Philip Sousa
- Igor Stravinsky
- Ralph Vaughan Williams
- Clifton Williams

==== Late 20th century to the present ====
Over the last fifty years, many composers have written major works for wind ensemble. Some rose to prominence for helping to develop the concert band.

- Samuel Adler
- Amri Amin
- Kenneth Amis
- Brian Balmages
- James Barnes
- Roland Barrett
- Leslie Bassett
- Warren Benson
- Derek Bourgeois
- Jerry Brubaker
- Mark Camphouse
- John Barnes Chance
- Steven Bryant
- Filip Ceunen
- Chew Jia Yuan
- Nigel Clarke
- Michael Colgrass
- John Corigliano
- James Curnow
- Greg Danner
- Michael Daugherty
- Ingolf Dahl
- Elliot del Borgo
- David Del Tredici
- Robert Foster
- Rossano Galante
- David Gillingham
- Julie Giroux
- Zechariah Goh
- Adam Gorb
- Peter Graham
- Donald Grantham
- Edward Gregson
- Jacob de Haan
- Samuel Hazo
- Frigyes Hidas
- Jennifer Higdon
- Hayato Hirose
- David Holsinger
- Alan Hovhaness
- Ralph Hultgren
- Karel Husa
- Yasuhide Ito
- Robert E. Jager
- Soichi Konayaga
- Jinjun Lee
- John Mackey
- Timothy Mahr
- David Maslanka
- W. Francis McBeth
- Johan de Meij
- Hardy Mertens
- Paul Murtha
- Lior Navok
- Ron Nelson
- Mitsuo Nonami
- Carter Pann
- Vincent Persichetti
- Timothy Reynish
- Mekel Rogers
- Jan Van der Roost
- Randall D. Standridge
- Richard St. Clair
- Itaru Sakai
- Richard L. Saucedo
- Gunther Schuller
- Joseph Schwantner
- Alex Shapiro
- Robert Sheldon
- Robert W. Smith
- Philip Sparke
- Jack Stamp
- Karlheinz Stockhausen
- Masafumi Suzuki
- James Swearingen
- Xander Tan
- Kelly Tang
- Frank Ticheli
- Fisher Tull
- Eric Whitacre
- Satoshi Yagisawa
- Benjamin Yeo
- Bertram Wee
- Kahchun Wong
- John Zdechlik

== Wind-band research ==
Research on wind-band topics began in earnest in 1964 through the Journal of Band Research, affiliated with the American Bandmasters Association.

During the early 21st century, organizations that promote band research began publishing more research on wind band-related topics: Germany-based IGEB (founded 1974), the World Association of Symphonic Bands and Ensembles (WASBE, founded 1983), and US-based organizations Historic Brass Society (founded 1988), National Band Association (NBA, founded 1960), and College Band Directors National Association (CBDNA, founded 1941).

Internationally notable wind-band researchers include Vincent Dubois on French bands, Paul Niemisto on Finnish bands, Frederick Harris on wind-band conductors, Jill M. Sullivan on US women's bands, Frank Battisti on US bands, David Hebert on Japanese and Polynesian bands, Patrick M. Jones on US military bands, and David Whitwell on European bands and repertoire.

== Band associations ==
Some notable band associations include:

- American Bandmasters Association
- British Association of Symphonic Bands and Wind Ensembles
- All Japan Band Association
- Association of Concert Bands
- Lesbian and Gay Band Association
- National Band Council of Australia
- Wind Band Association of Singapore

== See also ==
- Ottoman military band
- United States military bands
