= Lars Kristian Brynildsen =

Norwegian musician

Lars Kristian Holm Brynildsen (8 October 1954 - 17 August 2005) was a Norwegian clarinetist. He was principal clarinet of the Bergen Philharmonic Orchestra from 1979 until his death in 2005 and was a member of the Bergen Woodwind Quintet for 25 years. Before coming to Bergen, he was principal clarinet in the Stavanger Symphony Orchestra. He studied clarinet at the music conservatories in Oslo, Norway and Freiburg, Germany in addition to taking private lessons in Paris. As a young musician he played in the World Youth Symphony. He performed numerous times as soloist with the Bergen Philharmonic Orchestra and also taught at the Grieg Academy of Music in Bergen. He served as music director of the Bergen Symphonic Band from 1986 to 1996.

== Resources ==
- Dragefjellets Musikkorps website
- Bergen Woodwind Quintet website
