= East Winds Symphonic Band =

The East Winds Symphonic Band (EWSB) is a community concert band based in Pittsburgh, Pennsylvania. Founded in 1981, the band's membership includes more than 80 amateur, volunteer musicians from the greater Pittsburgh area. The band has performed at national conventions of the Association of Concert Bands (ACB) as well as annual local concerts at the historic Rodef Shalom Congregation, Kennywood Park's Celebrate America series, and as part of the Three Rivers Community Band Festival.

== History ==
The band was founded in 1981 by Roger Schneider, Ed Dzenis, and Ron Johnson. The first conductor of the band was Jay Stivanson, followed by Jim Rosetti. Susan Sands has been the conductor of the East Winds Symphonic Band since 1990. The band initially rehearsed in Wilkinsburg, Pennsylvania before moving to Forest Hills in 1993.

The band's mission relates to initiatives in Pittsburgh to "provide people of different backgrounds and economic levels to enjoy the arts" and it participates in several free concert series in support of community music initiatives. For this work, in 2008, the band received the Sudler Silver Scroll Award from the John Philip Sousa Foundation. That same year, the band had its first performance outside of the Pittsburgh area at the annual Association of Concert Bands national convention in Corning, New York. In 2011, the EWSB again performed at the ACB national convention in Muskegon, Michigan. The band has performed twice at the Chautauqua Institution in Chautauqua, New York, including the final concert at the "Sunday Afternoon in the Amphitheater" concert series. The East Winds Symphonic Band was the host organization for the national Association of Concert Bands convention in 2016.

== Local Initiatives ==
The EWSB has hosted the Three Rivers Community Band Festival, an annual concert featuring concert bands from Western Pennsylvania and Ohio, since 2004. The Three Rivers Community Band Festival features guest conductors leading a group of 95+ musicians from around the region in a one-day band rehearsal. Past guest conductors include James Gourlay and Samuel Hazo.

Since 2011, the EWSB has run the Summer Side-by-Side program, which allows student musicians in local high schools the chance to rehearse with the band and perform during the summer concert season.

In 2016, the band received a proclamation from the office of Pittsburgh Mayor William Peduto naming April 2016 "Greater Pittsburgh Community Concert Band Month" in honor of its work to promote music in the community.

== Commissions ==
- Parkour - Samuel Hazo (2011)
- Three Rivers Rhapsody - Jerry Brubaker (2016)
