= Giles Easterbrook =

English composer, conductor and writer

Giles Robertson Harding Easterbrook (3 January 1949 – 1 September 2021) was a British composer, musician and music publisher. He was an influential promoter of 20th-century and contemporary British music.

== Education and Novello ==
Easterbrook was born in Berlin but grew up in Horley, Surrey. He was educated at Purley Grammar School and Worcester College, Oxford, where he switched subjects from Ancient Egyptology and Coptic to music after receiving some private tuition from Kenneth Leighton. He began his career in the early 1970s as a concert manager, then joined music publisher Novello, where he soon became head of promotion.

Over 16 years Easterbrook worked closely with many composers, including Sir Arthur Bliss, Peter Dickinson, Herbert Howells, Daniel Jones, John Joubert, Nicola LeFanu, John McCabe and Thea Musgrave. He helped set up the Kenneth Leighton Trust, worked with Lady Bliss to establish the Bliss Trust in 1986, and promoted and edited some early works by Constant Lambert, including the early Piano Concerto and the ballet Mr Bear-Squash-You-All-Flat (1924).

== After Novello ==
In 1988 after leaving Novello he founded his own music publishing company, Maecenas Music, working there with composers including Judith Bingham, Philip Grange, Kenneth Hesketh, Stephen McNeff, Geoffrey Poole and Matthew Taylor. Music for wind ensemble became a speciality of the company, on which he often collaborated with Timothy Reynish at the Royal Northern College of Music. In 1996 he co-founded the Prima Facie record label with pianist, composer and producer Steve Plews. It issued a disc of his own music, The Moon Underwater, in 2010. A revised reissue was released in 2023. Easterbrook was the author of many CD liner notes and contributed to The New Grove Dictionary of Music.

He was involved in many aspects of the classical music industry, directing and managing theatre music, composing, performing and ensemble direction, adjudication, tour managing, speaking and broadcasting. He was co-founder of the Chameleon Composers Group and was involved in the organization of the British Music Society, Redcliffe Concerts and (with John Woolf) the Park Lane Group concert series.

== Personal life ==
He married Jane Armstrong in 2013. She chose his piece Out of the Purple for clarinet and piano as the concluding music at his funeral.
