= Osaka Shion Wind Orchestra =

Japanese Orchestra

- Concert band
- Native name: Japanese: オオサカ・シオン・ウインド・オーケストラ
- Short name: Shion (シオン)
- Founded: June 1923; 102 years ago
- Location: Osaka, Osaka, Japan
- Principal conductor: Managing Director' / Bandmaster; Tetsuya Ishii; Music Director; Akira Miyagawa; Artistic Adviser; Kazuyoshi Akiyama; Concertmaster; Yoshihiko Koga
- Website: shion.jp

The Osaka Shion Wind Orchestra (オオサカ・シオン・ウインド・オーケストラ, Ōsaka Shion Uindo Ōkesutora), former Osaka Municipal Symphonic Band (大阪市音楽団, Ōsaka-shi Ongakudan) (OMSB), Osaka City Wind Orchestra, also known as Shion (市音, シオン) is a professional concert band based in Osaka, Japan. OMSB was established in 1923, which is the longest running wind orchestra in Japan. OMSB was under the direct management of the city of Osaka.

== History ==
The origin of OMSB is the Imperial Japanese Army 4th Division Band (大日本帝国陸軍第4師団軍楽隊, Dai-Nippon Teikoku Rikugun Daiyon Shidan Gungakutai) founded in 1888.

=== The IJA Fourth Division Band ===
- February 28, 1888 – The attachment of the Third Military Band to the Osaka Garrison was determined.
- March 6, 1888 – The bandmaster and a fifty-piece military band took up their duties.
- May 14, 1888 – With the reorganization of the military system, the Osaka Garrison has been abolished and the fourth division was formed.
- March 25, 1923 – The 4th Division Band has disbanded due to disarmament. The farewell concert was held at the Tennouji Music Hall.

=== Osaka Municipal Symphonic Band ===
- June 1, 1923 – Volunteers who were the former band members established Osaka Music Band (大阪市音楽隊, Ōsaka-shi Ongakutai). They managed the band under the membership system in those days. Funds for management were depended on a subsidy from Osaka city and earnings from requested performances.
- April 1, 1934 – OMSB came under the direct management of the city of Osaka, and all the members of OMSB became city officials.
- June 22, 1946 – The band name has renamed as Osaka Municipal Symphonic Band (大阪市音楽団, Ōsaka-shi Ongakudan).
- Since 1962 – OMSB has taken charge of recordings of an entrance march for the National High School Baseball Invitational Tournament every year.

=== Osaka City Wind Orchestra ===
- April 1, 2014 – OMSB has been privatized as a general incorporated association. The English name has renamed as Osaka City Wind Orchestra.

=== Osaka Shion Wind Orchestra ===
- July 1, 2014 – The English name has renamed as Osaka Shion Wind Orchestra.
- March 16, 2015 – The band name has renamed as Osaka Shion Wind Orchestra (オオサカ・シオン・ウインド・オーケストラ, Ōsaka Shion Uindo Ōkesutora).
- April 1, 2018 – The organization has been a public interest incorporated association.

== Conductors ==
- Hong-Jae Kim (1991–1994 Principal Conductor)
- Heinz Friesen (1995–1998 Principal Conductor)
- Shunsaku Tsutsumi (1998–2002 Artistic Adviser, Principal Conductor)
- Kazumasa Watanabe (2001–2002 Principal Guest Conductor)
- Kazuyoshi Akiyama (2003 – Special Conductor, Artistic Adviser)
- Kazuhiko Komatsu (2007–2013 Principal Guest Conductor)
- Akira Miyagawa (2010–2013 Artistic Director, 2014 – Music Director)
- You Nishimura (2017–2020 Resident Conductor)
