= Tikkurilan Soittokunta =

Tikkurilan Soittokunta is a concert band in Vantaa, Finland. It was founded in 1945 and registered as an independent non-profit society 'Tikkurilan musiikkiyhdistys' (Tikkurila Music Society) in 1947. Current name has been used since 1972. The wind band is also known with the name TixiBand, especially in the occasions performing lighter genres of music. The name of the band is originating from the city hall district of Vantaa, Tikkurila, which is often called locally with the shorter nickname 'Tiksi'.

Tikkurilan Soittokunta can be considered as a community band. In addition to its own concerts twice a year it is often invited to perform in local public events arranged by the municipality, parishes and varied societies.

Current conductor is Kimmo Nurmi (Since 2003)

== Repertoire ==
Late years the wind band has been focusing on film music, pop music, and social dance music e.g. waltz and tango. In main themed concerts the band has invited vocal soloists. Occasionally the choice of soloists has been quite unconvententional like actor Martti Suosalo as a performing singer and Erkki Liikanen singing classical repertoire even if famous for comedy music and hit ballades.

The repertoire includes also Finnish wind band classics and standard international concert band music, like parts of Holst's First Suite in E, and seasonal music.

== Discography ==
- Tikkurilan Soittokunta viihdyttää ja tanssittaa, cassette tape(1990)
- Tixi-Mix CD (2008)
- TixiBand ja Kaksi Legendaa/ Martti Suosalo, Kari Fall CD (2011)
