= Northshore Concert Band =

100-member concert band based in Evanston, Illinois

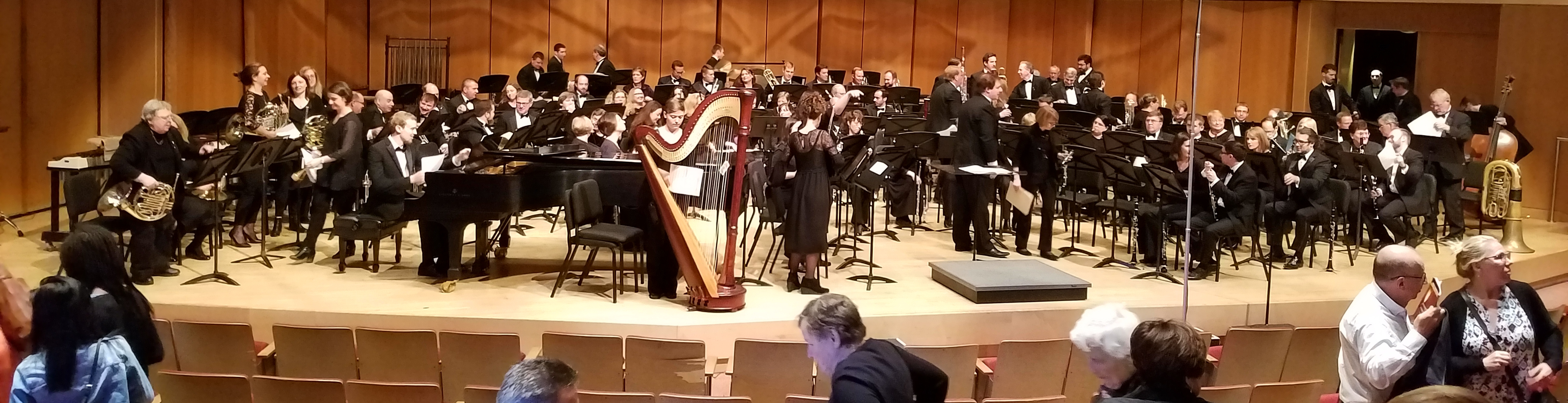

Background information
- Also known as: NCB
- Origin: Evanston, Illinois
- Genres: Classical
- Occupation: Concert band
- Years active: 1956-present
- Members: Artistic Director; Dr. Mallory Thompson; Assistant Conductor; Daniel J. Farris; Founder; John P. Paynter
- Website: www.northshoreband.org

The Northshore Concert Band (NCB) is a 100-member concert band based in Evanston, Illinois which performs throughout the Chicago metropolitan area.

== History ==
NCB was founded in 1956 and led for 40 years by the late John P. Paynter, who was director of bands at Northwestern University, an accomplished arranger, and president of many band organizations, including the Midwest Clinic and the American Bandmasters Association.

Highlights of NCB's history include performance and clinician appearances at the annual Midwest Clinic in Chicago, performing with the Chicago Symphony Chorus at Orchestra Hall, and many appearances at band festivals and conferences throughout the United States and Europe.

Additional highlights include performances with internationally renowned guest artists including Dale Clevenger, Larry Combs, Adolph Herseth, John Houseman, Wynton Marsalis, Allen Vizzutti, and William Warfield. Performances with prominent guest conductors have included Harry Begian, Eugene Migliaro Corporon, Frederick Fennell, Donald Hunsberger, Karel Husa, and H. Robert Reynolds.

NCB performs several concerts a year in the Chicago metropolitan area which include a subscription concert series at Northwestern University's Pick-Staiger Concert Hall, educational outreach programs at area schools, many summer concerts at the invitation of various communities and venues, and professional band festivals and conferences.

The band has toured in Canada and Europe and extensively throughout the United States. In 2001, NCB was the first band from the United States invited to perform at the Festival des Anches d’Azur in La Croix Valmer, France. In 2012, the band returned to Europe and performed in Switzerland and Germany on a joint venture with Blasorchester Niederschopfheim, a German community wind band with a 100-year history.

NCB musical leadership is provided by artistic director, Dr. Mallory Thompson, and Assistant Conductor, Daniel J. Farris. Dr. Thompson first conducted the Northshore Concert Band in April 1999 and was named principal guest conductor that same season. In 2003, Dr. Thompson accepted an expanded role as NCB Artistic Director.

== Leadership ==
Throughout its history, NCB has promoted the development of community bands. This has been accomplished through performances, recordings, the sponsorship of three adult band conferences, and publication of The Community Band: A Manual of Organization and Operation, which has been used to start or improve many community bands in the United States.

In 1987, the NCB became the first recipient of the Sudler Silver Scroll Award from the John Philip Sousa Foundation. The Sudler Scroll recognizes and honors those community bands that have demonstrated particularly high standards of excellence in concert activities over a period of several years, and which have played a significant and leading role in the cultural and musical environment in their respective communities.

In November 2003, Meredith Music published a history of NCB entitled On the Path to Excellence: The Northshore Concert Band—Paynter, Buehlman and Beyond. Researched and written by Dr. William Carson of Coe College, the book provides a detailed historical record and analysis of the band's first 36 years.

== Commissions and Recordings ==
As a supporter of new music for wind band NCB has commissioned ten works during its history. NCB has also released ten recordings on CD, seven studio recordings and three live recordings from the annual Midwest Clinic. In 2011, Chicago classical radio station, WFMT, broadcast two programs of live performances from NCB's concert series at Pick-Staiger Concert Hall.

=== Commissions ===
- Symphonic March on an English Hymn Tune - Claude T. Smith (1984)
- Capriccio for saxophone quartet and band - Warren Barker (1988)
- Symphony No. 7 "Mythologies" - James F. Hopkins (1989)
- Four Brothers - Jimmy Giuffre/John Tatgenhorst (1992)
- All Pleasant Things - James Barnes (1997)
- Symphonic Prelude - Mark Camphouse (2006)
- Duo Concertante for Clarinet and Percussion - Michael Burritt (2006)
- Nitro - Frank Ticheli (2006)
- Windy City Overture - Johan de Meij (2006)
- Let the Amen Sound - Travis Cross (2012)
- Zero to Sixty! - Michael Martin (2015)

=== Recordings ===
- Sleigh Ride (1986)
- Stars and Stripes: Music for a Summer Evening (1994)
- European Tradition (1996)
- The Paynter Years (1996)
- American Emblems (1999)
- Mythologies (1999)
- 2001 Midwest Clinic: Northshore Concert Band (2001)
- From Broadway to Hollywood (2002)
- 2005 Midwest Clinic: Northshore Concert Band (2005)
- 2011 Midwest Clinic: Northshore Concert Band (2011)

== Educational Outreach ==
NCB is the co-sponsor of the Northshore Concert Band/Northwestern University Festival of Music. Started in 1977, the festival has been held annually over a three-day period in March on the campus of Northwestern University in Evanston, Illinois. The band's members serve as adjudicators and clinicians for this solo, ensemble, and band festival, which has attracted over 3,500 young musicians annually.

NCB has performed several educational outreach programs at area schools, many summer concerts at the invitation of various communities and venues, and professional band festivals and conferences.

In 2003, NCB started its Lifetime of Music program, inviting dozens of Chicago-area high school musicians to perform with the band at its Winter subscription concert in February.

NCB also awards the John P. Paynter Scholarship, which provides financial assistance toward an outstanding high school musician's college education and the opportunity to solo with the band.

== Former Music Directors ==
- John P. Paynter (1956-1996)
- Dr. Stephen Peterson (1996-1998)
- Dr. John Lynch (1999-2002)
- Dr. Lawrence Stoffel (2002-2003)
- Dr. Richard Fischer (2003-2005)
