= Nottingham Concert Band =

Background information
- Origin: Nottingham, East Midlands, England, United Kingdom
- Genres: Concert Band/Wind Band
- Years active: 1991- present
- Members: Principal Conductor; Robert Parker; Associate Conductor; Ashley Parnell; Chair; Greer Cook
- Website: www.nottinghamconcertband.org

Nottingham Concert Band (NCB) claims to be the largest community wind band in the Nottingham (UK) area and performs regularly throughout the county and beyond.

Based in West Bridgford, South Nottingham, it is independent and entirely self-financing. The band draws on a diversity of musical styles, from classical transcriptions to contemporary compositions and from film and show compilations to big band favourites.

== History ==
Part of the musical landscape of the East Midlands since 1991 Nottingham Concert Band began life as Trent Concert Band which in turn arose from the music department of Trent Polytechnic (now Nottingham Trent University). Since 1993, the band has been led by Conductor & Musical Director Robert Parker.

== Performances ==
Nottingham Concert Band has established a year-round program of formal evening concerts, plus a busy Summer season of outdoor engagements. Appearances in the recent past have included"

- West Bridgford Proms in the Park
- Nottingham Playhouse
- Nottingham Arts Theatre
- De la Beche Theatre, Keyworth
- Goose Fair, Nottingham
- Southwell Minster
- Center Parcs, Sherwood
- RAF Waddington International Airshow
- Bingham Town Fair
- Christmas in Nottingham's Old Market Square
- Fund-raising events for various charities
- Summer fetes for local schools and community festivals
- Bandstand concerts in Nottingham, Newark, Melton Mowbray, Loughborough, Long Eaton, Grantham, Stamford, Ilkeston and Bourne.

== Conductor, musical director ==
Robert Parker
A Graduate and Fellow of Trinity College London, where he studied horn and piano, Robert performs professionally in a wide diversity of contexts. He also teaches brass both privately and in Nottinghamshire schools and is the county representative for the Trinity Guildhall examinations board.

== Associate conductor ==
Ashley Parnell

== Chairman ==
Mrs Greer Cook
Greer plays Flute in the band and has been chair since 2020.

== Members ==
Band membership stands currently at over 60 musicians, who come from all across the East Midlands and who range in age from 18 to 70-plus.
