= Frank Ticheli =

American composer (born 1958)

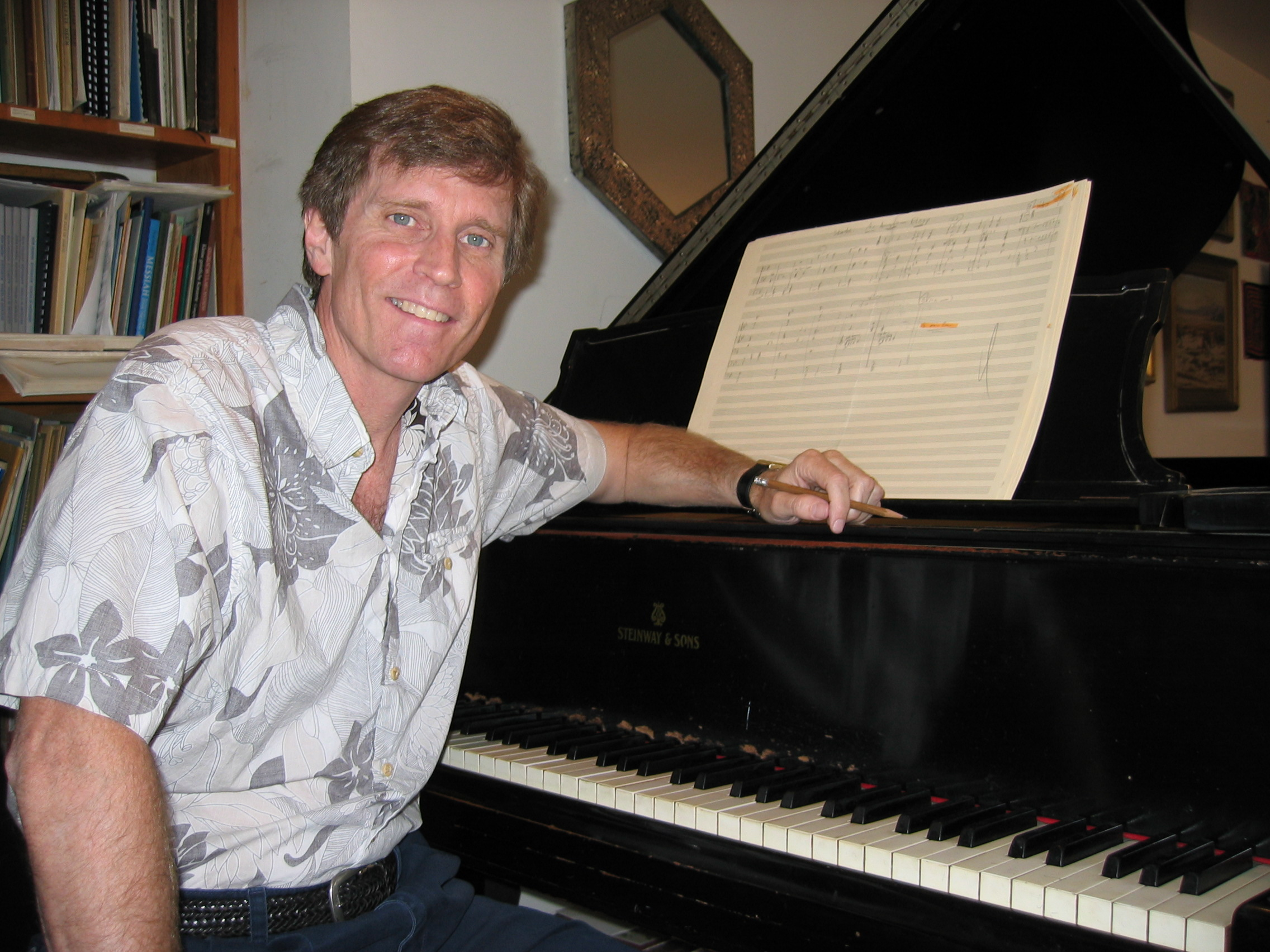
- Born: Frank Ticheli; January 21, 1958 (age 68); Monroe, Louisiana, U.S.
- Education: University of Michigan
- Occupation: Composer
- Years active: 1978–present

Frank Ticheli (/tɪˈkɛli/ tih-KEL-ee; born January 21, 1958) is an American composer of orchestral, choral, chamber, and concert band works. Ticheli is a Professor Emeritus of Composition at the University of Southern California and was formerly the Pacific Symphony's composer-in-residence from 1991 to 1998, composing numerous works for that orchestra. A number of his works have become standards in concert band repertoire.

== Early life and education ==
Frank Ticheli was born on January 21, 1958 in Monroe, Louisiana. He graduated from Lloyd V. Berkner High School in Richardson, Texas and earned a Bachelor of Music in Composition and Music Education from Southern Methodist University, where he studied with Donald Erb and Jack Waldenmaier. He went on to receive his master's and doctoral degrees in composition from the University of Michigan, where he studied with William Albright, Leslie Bassett, George Wilson, and William Bolcom.

== Career ==
Subsequently, Ticheli became an Assistant Professor of Music at Trinity University in San Antonio, Texas. There, he served on the board of directors of the Texas Composers Forum and was a member of the advisory committee for the San Antonio Symphony's "Music of the Americas" project. From 1991 to 1998, Ticheli was composer-in-residence with the Pacific Symphony Orchestra in Orange County, California. Since 1991, he has been a Professor of Composition at the University of Southern California's Thornton School of Music. In 2011, he endowed the "Frank Ticheli Guest Artist Fund" to support visiting composers and/or ensembles who specialize in the performance of new music.

Ticheli resides in Los Angeles, California.

== Awards and grants ==
Ticheli has been the recipient of numerous awards, including the Arts and Letters Award, Goddard Lieberson Fellowship, and Charles Ives Scholarship, all from the American Academy of Arts and Letters. He is a two-time recipient of the National Band Association/Revelli Memorial Prize. He has also received the A. Austin Harding Award, the Distinguished Service to Music Medal, and First Prize in the Texas Sesquicentennial Orchestral Composition Competition, the Britten-on-the-Bay Choral Composition Contest, and the Virginia CBDNA Symposium for New Band Music. In addition to these awards, Ticheli has been named a national honorary member of Phi Mu Alpha Sinfonia and Kappa Kappa Psi.

Grants and commissions for Ticheli's works have come from Chamber Music America, the American Music Center, Pacific Symphony, Pacific Chorale, Worldwide Concurrent Premieres, Inc., Prince George's Philharmonic Orchestra, Adrian Symphony, City of San Antonio, Stephen F. Austin State University, University of Michigan, Trinity University, and the Indiana Bandmasters Association, and many others. His work, Angels in the Architecture, for concert band with soprano soloist, was commissioned by Kingsway International (now KI Concerts) and received its premiere performance in July 2008 by a massed band of young musicians from Australia and the U.S. at the Sydney Opera House.

== Works ==
Ticheli's works are published by Manhattan Beach Music, Encore Music Publishers, and Hinshaw Music, and are recorded on the labels of Albany, Chandos, Clarion, Delos, Equilibrium, Klavier, Koch International Classics, Mark, Naxos, Reference, and others. They include the following:

=== For orchestra ===
- All the World's a Stage, for audience and orchestra (2020)
- Rest, for string orchestra (2012)
- Riffs for Steven (2010)
- Angels in the Architecture (2009)
- An American Elegy (2008)
- Shooting Stars (2004)
- Symphony No. 1 (2001)
- Blue Shades (1997)
- Radiant Voices (1993)
- On Time's Stream (1995)
- Postcard (1995)
- Pacific Fanfare (1995)
- Images of a Storm (1983)

=== For solo with orchestra ===
- Concerto for Clarinet and Orchestra (2011)
- Symphony No. 1 (solo tenor or baritone in mvt. 4 only) (2001)
- An American Dream (with solo soprano) (1998)
- Playing With Fire (for seven-piece jazz band and orchestra) (1992)
- Concerto for Trumpet and Orchestra (1990)

=== For chorus and orchestra ===
- Sailing the Sky (2021)
- The Shore, a choral symphony on four poems of David St. John (2013)

=== For chorus ===
- Listen to the Silence, (2024)
- Until Forever Fades Away, for chorus and strings (2020)
- Lux Aeterna (2018)
- Here Take this Lovely Flower (2012)
- Constellation: Three Poems of Sara Teasdale (2010)
- Earth Song (2007)
- The Song Within (2004)
- There Will Be Rest (2000)

=== For wind ensemble/concert band ===
- Fantastic Dreams (2024)
- Over the Moon (2022)
- BASH (2021)
- Life-Stream (2021)
- Sailing the Sky (existing in two versions, one including chorus and one not)(2021)
- Lux Perpetua (2020)– winner of the 2021 NBA/William D. Revelli Memorial Band Composition Contest
- Silver Lining, Concerto for Flute and Wind Ensemble (2017)
- Acadiana (2017)
- Dancing on Water (2015)
- December Snow (2015)
- Concerto for Alto Saxophone and Wind Ensemble (2014)
- Earth Song (2014)
- Korean Folksongs from Jeju Island (2013)
- First Light (2013)
- Songs of Love and Life, for soprano and 18 players (2012)
- Concerto for Clarinet and Concert Band (2011)
- San Antonio Dances (2011)
- Rest (2011)
- Amen! (2009)
- Angels in the Architecture (2009)
- The Tyger (2008)
- Symphony No. 1 (transcribed by Gary Green)
- Wild Nights! (2007)
- Nitro (2006) – commissioned by the Northshore Concert Band
- Sanctuary (2006)
- Abracadabra (2005)
- Joy Revisited (2005)
- Joy (2005)
- Symphony No. 2 (2004) – winner of the 2006 NBA/William D. Revelli Memorial Band Composition Contest
- Ave Maria (2004)
- A Shaker Gift Song (2004)
- Pacific Fanfare (2003)
- Loch Lomond (2002)
- Simple Gifts: Four Shaker Songs (2002)
- An American Elegy (2000)
- Vesuvius (1999)
- Shenandoah (1999)
- Blue Shades (1997)
- Sun Dance (1997)
- Cajun Folk Songs II (1997)
- Postcard (1994)
- Gaian Visions (1994)
- Amazing Grace (1994)
- Cajun Folk Songs (1990)
- Fortress (1988)
- Portrait of a Clown (1988)
- Music for Winds & Percussion (1988)
- Concertino for Trombone and Band (1987)

=== For chamber ensemble ===
- "In C Dorian" (2020)
- Serenade for Kristin (2014)
- Concerto for Clarinet (2011)
- Out of the Blue (2004)
- Songs of Tagore (1992)
- Back Burner (1989)
- Here We Stand (1989)
- Concertino for Trombone (1987)
- The First Voice (1987)
- String Quartet (1986)
- Fantasy (1984)
- Two Songs of Loss (1983)
- Humouresque (1980)
- Poltergeists (1980)
- No Time (1980)
- Three Movements (1979)
- Trio for Brass (1978)
