= Dragefjellets Musikkorps =

Norwegian musical band

Dragefjellets Musikkorps, also known as the Bergen Symphonic Band, is an elite division amateur wind band in Bergen, Norway.

It traces its beginnings from 1909 as the band at the Dragefjellet School. On 1 September 1914 it was formed as Norway's first amateur wind band by older members from the school band, along with Dragefjellet School headmaster, Sverre Vigander. It remained a relatively small band until Ragnar Maalen became conductor in 1970. Maalen served from 1970–1982, and led during a period in which "Dragen" expanded its membership and established its goals of becoming a leading Norwegian band. It won the first Norwegian Wind Band Championships in 1981 with Maalen conducting. Lars Kristian Brynildsen was conductor for ten years from 1986 to 1996. And the band won the Norwegian championships twice during this period. After Brynildsen's departure, Dragen continued without a principal conductor, and worked with numerous conductors (including Brynildsen) on a project-by-project basis for the next decade. The band has won the Norwegian Wind Band Championships a total of seven times: 1981, 1983, 1988, 1992, 2006, 2007 and 2009. It has close ties with the Grieg Academy of music (at the University of Bergen), and many of its members are current or former academy students.

Timeline:

- 1909 - Dragefjellets Skole Musikkorps started.
- 1914 - Dragefjellets Musikkorps started by older members of the school band, with school headmaster Sverre Vigander.
- 1918 - The band has 18 members.
- 1921 - (June 29) Band purchases property, outside of Bergen, on which the cottage Dragehytten will eventually sit.
- 1958 - Records its first record album.
- 1968 - Women first allowed to join the band.
- 1970 - Ragnar Maalen, principal trombonist in the Bergen Philharmonic Orchestra, becomes conductor. Band has 15 - 20 members.
- 1981 - Band wins the Norwegian national championships for first time.
- 1982 - Records its second album.
- 1983 - Band wins the Norwegian national championships for second time.
- 1987 - Lars Kristian Brynildsen, principal clarinet in the Bergen Philharmonic Orchestra, becomes conductor.
- 1988 - Band wins the Norwegian national championships for third time.
- 1989 - Band receives 1st prize with distinction, at World Band Championship competition in the Netherlands.
- 1992 - Band wins the Norwegian national championships for fourth time.
- 1993 - Records its third album, its first on CD format.
- 1996 - Band begins a 10-year period without conductor, using various conductors on a project basis.
- 2002 - Band participates in the French Reeds Riviera Festival in la Croix Valmer, France, with Lars Kristian Brynildsen, conducting.
- 2005 - Former conductor, Lars Kristian Brynildsen, dies.
- 2006 - Band wins the Norwegian national championships for fifth time, releases fourth album, Merit, with Martin Winter conducting.
- 2007 - Band wins the Norwegian national championships for sixth time, has over 50 members. Gary Peterson, principal trumpet in the Bergen Philharmonic Orchestra hired as Artistic Director.
- 2007 - Former conductor, Ragnar Maalen awarded fortjenstmedaljen for service to Norwegian Music life.
- 2009 - Band wins the Norwegian national championships for the seventh time, celebrates 100th anniversary of Dragefjellets Skole Musikkorps.

Resources:

- Official Site (in Norwegian)
- Music Information Center Norway
- Norwegian Wind Band Championships (Norwegian Wikipedia)
- History of Bergen Symphonic Band
- Information on Dragehytten
- Information from NMF on Ragnar Maalen (in Norwegian)
- Speech on Ragnar Maalen by Svein Alsaker (in Norwegian)
