= British Association of Symphonic Bands and Wind Ensembles =

- Abbreviation: BASBWE
- Formation: 1981
- Legal status: Non-profit organization, BASBWE Education Trust - registered charity no. 803415
- Purpose: Symphonic bands and wind ensembles in the UK
- Region served: UK
- Members: UK wind ensembles and symphonic bands
- Current Chair: Shea Lolin
- Website: BASBWE
- Remarks: Publication: Winds Magazine

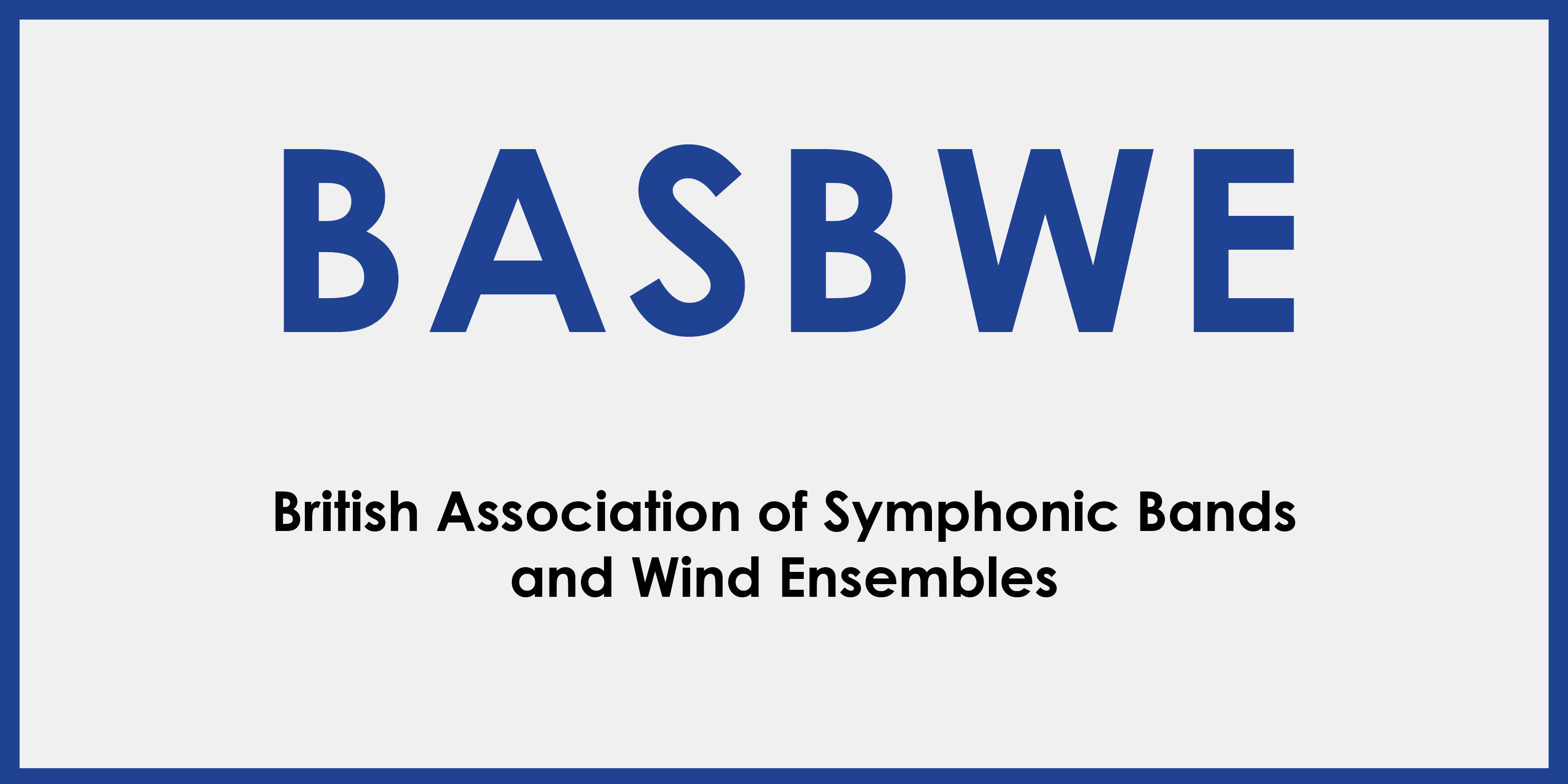
BASBWE Logo

The British Association of Symphonic Bands and Wind Ensembles is a membership organisation that represents symphonic bands and wind ensembles, also known as concert bands, in the UK.

== History ==
It was founded in July 1981 by Timothy Reynish at a conference for symphonic bands and wind ensembles at the Royal Northern College of Music (RNCM) in Manchester.

=== Participation ===
Wind ensembles are often found at universities, and are more prevalent amongst younger people, who have more opportunity and encouragement to join like-minded musical people, e.g. at some schools. Older people would not be able, by definition, to join these bands. The existence of a wind band at a particular school is strongly associated with more successful schools. However a successful school need not have a wind band or orchestra.

== Structure ==
It is partly funded by the PRS Foundation.

== Function ==
It publishes Winds Magazine and runs the BASBWE Education Trust, which was formed in April 1990 and registered as a charity in June 1990.

== BASBWE Commissions ==
The British Association of Symphonic Bands and Wind Ensembles has played a significant role in the development of wind band repertoire in the United Kingdom through an extensive programme of commissions. Since 1981, BASBWE has commissioned, either independently or in collaboration with partners, over 50 works for wind ensemble and symphonic band. In addition, the College Commissioning Consortium, founded in 1994 and administered by the BASBWE Education Trust, has contributed a further body of commissioned works.

Through these initiatives, BASBWE has encouraged leading British and international composers to contribute to the repertoire, significantly expanding the artistic scope and visibility of the medium.

=== Selected commissions ===
- 1983 – Philip Wilby, Firestar; Guy Woolfenden, Gallimaufry
- 1984 – Arthur Butterworth, Tundra; Joseph Horovitz, Bacchus on Blue Ridge
- 1985 – David Bedford, Sea & Sky & Golden Hill
- 1986 – Guy Woolfenden, Illyrian Dances
- 1987 – Richard Rodney Bennett, Morning Music; Michael Ball, Omaggio
- 1988 – George Lloyd, Forest of Arden
- 1990 – James MacMillan, Sowetan Spring; Carl Davis, Landscapes; Martin Dalby, Flight Dreaming
- 1991 – Paul Patterson, The Mighty Voice; Richard Rodney Bennett, The Four Seasons; John McCabe, Canyons
- 1993 – Martin Butler, Still Breathing; Colin Matthews, Toccata Meccana; Richard Rodney Bennett, Trumpet Concerto; Michael Ball, Chaucer’s Tunes; Michael Hurd, Plaine and Fancie; Richard Gordon Smith, The Bacchae
- 1994 – David Bedford, Susato Variations; Alan Bullard, Heritage; Michael Ball, Saxophone Concerto; Martin Ellerby, Paris Sketches; Gary Carpenter, Flying God Suite
- 1995 – Adam Gorb, Bermuda Triangle; Julian Johnson, Breathing Space
- 1996 – Barry Forgie, Jazzin’ the Community; Edward Gregson, Concerto for Piano and Wind; Edward Newell, Sinfonietta; Adam Gorb, Bridgewater Breeze, Awayday, Euphonium Concerto
- 1997 – John Casken, Distant Variations; Samuel Becker, Dances of Puck; Philip Wilby, A Passion for Our Time; Aulis Sallinen, The Palace Rhapsody
- 1998 – Adam Gorb, Yiddish Dances, The Elements; Martin Ellerby, New England Dances; Timothy Ewers, Concerto Grosso
- 1999 – Stephen Montague, Deep in the Vaults of Earth; Brian Wilshere, Chaconne
- 2001 – Judith Bingham, Bright Spirit; Philip Sparke, 4 Norfolk Dances; Paul Harris, Ally Pally
- 2002 – James Rae, Two Cinematic Impressions; Guy Woolfenden, Firedance; Andy Pearce, Circus Music
- 2003 – Andy Pearce, The Heroes Rise; Dave Smith, Fractures; Kenneth Hesketh, Whirligigg
- 2004 – John Reeman, Wind Mass; Adam Gorb, Burlesque; Jim Pywell, Yellow Stripe

=== College Commissioning Consortium ===
The College Commissioning Consortium was established in 1994 to support the creation of new works through collaboration between educational institutions.

- 1994 – Thea Musgrave, Journey through a Japanese Landscape
- 1995 – Robert Saxton, Ring, Time
- 1996 – Dominic Muldowney, Dance Suite
- 1997 – Ilona Sekacz, Let the Magpie Dream
- 1998 – John Woolrich, Sennets and Tuckets
- 1999 – Elena Firsova, Captivity
- 2000 – John Dankworth, Hemming Way
- 2001 – Kit Turnbull, Tetrasemic Interventions; Alessandro Timossi, Commedia; Julia Gomelskaya, The Riot; Guy Woolfenden, Serenade for Sophia; Rodney Newton, The Four Elements; Alun Hoddinott, Bagatelles; John Metcalf, Wind Quintet
- 2002 – Martin Ellerby, Meditations
- 2003 – Kenneth Hesketh, Diaghilev Dances
- 2004 – Timothy Raymond, Ave Regina Caelorum
- 2005 – Andy Scott, Saxophone Double Concerto “Dark Rain”
- 2006 – Simon Wills, Horn Concerto
- 2007 – Giles Swayne, Agnes Wisley’s Chillout Fantasy
