= Midwest Clinic =

Music education conference

The Midwest Clinic, An International Band and Orchestra Conference
- The logo of the Midwest Clinic
- Abbreviation: MWIBOC
- Formation: December 7, 1946
- Type: Learned society
- Legal status: Society
- Purpose: Educational
- Region served: Worldwide
- Members: music education professionals
- Official language: English
- President: Richard C. Crain
- Main organ: General Assembly
- Website: midwestclinic.org
- Formerly called: Mid-West Band Clinic

The Midwest Clinic International Band and Orchestra Conference is the world's largest instrumental music education conference, annually drawing approximately 17,000 attendees to Chicago from all 50 states and as many as forty countries. It is held every December in downtown Chicago. As a non-profit organization, the Midwest Clinic exists exclusively for educational purposes: to raise the standards of music education; to improve the methods employed in music education; to develop new teaching techniques; to disseminate to school music teachers, directors, supervisors, and others interested in music education information to assist in their professional work; to examine, analyze and appraise literature dealing with music; to hold clinics, lectures and demonstrations for the betterment of music education; and in general, to assist teachers and others interested in music education in better pursuing their profession.

== History ==
=== Timeline ===
1946 - First clinic was held under the name "Band Clinic"
1947 - Name changed to "Mid-West Band Clinic"
1951 - Name changed to "Mid-West National Band Clinic"
1962 - The Midwest Clinic Medal of Honor was created to recognize outstanding contributions to music education
1968 - Name changed to "Mid-West National Band and Orchestra Clinic"
1986 - Name changed to "Mid-West International Band and Orchestra Clinic"
1988 - College Night is instituted, bringing representatives of colleges, universities and the military into contact with students and teachers
1989 - The Teacher Resource Center is created
1990 - The Midwest Motifs newsletter is first published
1991 - The Midwest Clinic Industry Award is created to recognize outstanding contributions to music education through the music industry
1992 - The Midwest Clinic International Award is created to recognize outstanding contributions to music education through the music industry
1996 - The current name is adopted: "The Midwest Clinic, An International Band and Orchestra Conference"
1996 - The Midwest Clinic commissions its first two pieces of music, in honor of its 50th Anniversary
1997 - The United States Coast Guard Band presents two concerts on Wednesday night to meet the growing audience demand for the featured United States military band performances
2002 - Streaming video selections from concert performances are archived on the Midwest Clinic website, and the College Student and Beginning Teacher Track Series is created
2004 - Rehearsal labs are introduced at the Palmer House, and the Merle Reskin Theatre is added to the venues hosting Midwest Clinic events
2006 - High School Student Clinics are added at the Palmer House, and "blogs" are introduced to the Midwest Clinic website
2009 - The conference moves from the Hilton Chicago to McCormick Place West
2012 - The Midwest Clinic holds its Inaugural High School Day Program and First Orchestra Reading Session

=== Founders ===
H.E. Nutt, VanderCook College of Music
Howard Lyons, Lyons Band Instrument Company
Neil Kjos Sr., Neil A. Kjos Music Company

The Midwest Clinic began on December 7, 1946, when approximately 120 directors from the Chicago area assembled in a YWCA gymnasium on Chicago's West Side for a six-hour clinic and new music reading session. In 1947, the event was expanded to two days and moved to the Hotel Sherman to take advantage of the larger facility and accommodations for out-of-town directors. This second installment brought new features, including a printed program, an additional band, and a new name: The Mid-West Band Clinic. The VanderCook College of Music, Neil A. Kjos Music Company, and Lyons Band Instrument Company sponsored the event. For the next twenty-five years, the Hotel Sherman was home to the Midwest Clinic. In the 1950s, orchestras and jazz ensembles were introduced, and in 1962, the Midwest Clinic held its first official Orchestra Day. In 1963, the clinic expanded to its present format of four-and-a-half days. Since 1973, the Midwest Clinic has been held at the Hilton Chicago, and in 1995, the Blackstone Hotel was used in addition to the Hilton for hosting clinic events. With the addition of this facility, the Midwest Clinic was able to present more clinics. In 1999, the Congress Plaza replaced the Blackstone Hotel as the second site of conference events. In 2008, the Blackstone Hotel was once again added as a clinic venue after reopening in 2007. In 2008, the Midwest Clinic board of directors voted to move the conference to McCormick Place in order to house all Midwest events in one location.

In the earliest years of the "Mid-West Band Clinic", the organizers - H.E. Nutt, Howard Lyons, and Neil Kjos Sr. - invited outstanding bands to perform, based upon the reputations of the organization and their director. In addition to giving a formal concert, the bands were also expected to provide a sight-reading session, with the selections being requested by audience members on the spur of the moment. Over the years, the focus of the Midwest Clinic has remained on connecting music directors with published music, new and established teaching techniques and the products and services for music educators.

== Events ==
=== Concert Performances ===
Performances are given by organizations from around the world. Grade school, middle school, high school, college, military, adult, and professional groups all present concerts. The VanderCook College of Music Symphonic Band is the only ensemble that has performed at every Midwest Clinic since its start in 1946. Past performers include: Chicago Symphony Orchestra Brass, the Civic Orchestra of Chicago, the United States Coast Guard Band, the Indiana University Philharmonic, the U.S. Air Force Band, the U.S. Army Blues Jazz Ensemble, the U.S. Navy Band Commodores, the "President's Own" United States Marine Band, the Australian Wind Orchestra, the City of Milano Wind Orchestra, the Clarence Wind Ensemble, the Birmingham Symphonic Winds, the Tokyo Kosei Wind Orchestra, the Dallas Wind Symphony, the North Texas Wind Symphony, the Round Rock High School Symphony Orchestra and its ensembles, and the Eastman Wind Ensemble, Lafayette High School Symphonic Band.

=== Clinics ===
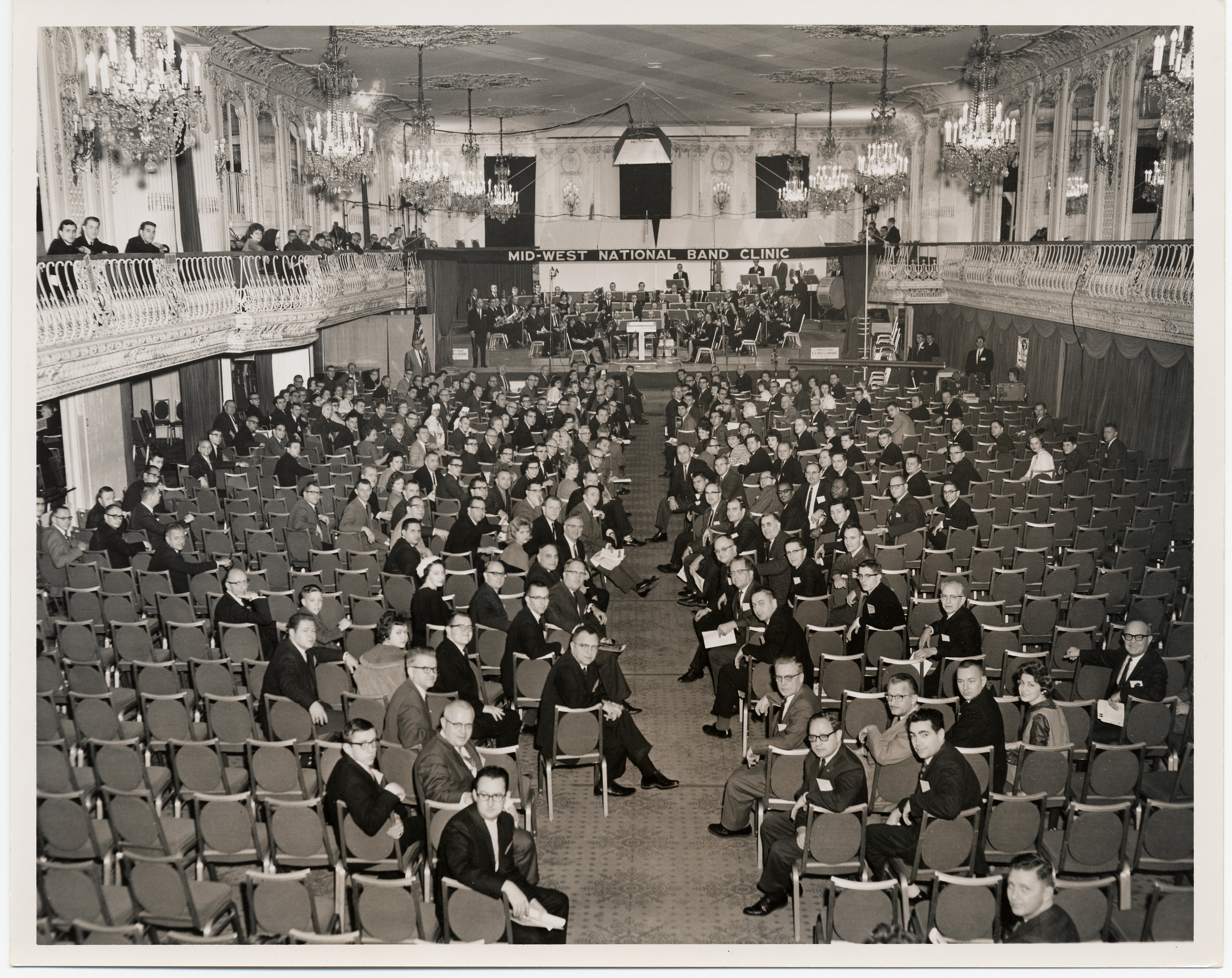
Midwest National Band Clinic, unknown date

More than eighty clinicians offer guidance and inspiration covering facets of instrumental music. Past clinicians include Gunther Schuller, Tim Lautzenheiser, John Corigliano, Wynton Marsalis, Mark Camphouse, Frank Ticheli, Frederic Fennell, Col. Arnald Gabriel, Himie Voxman, and Karel Husa.

== Board of directors ==
The Midwest Clinic is governed by a Board of Directors. Members are appointed upon being selected and invited by the Board when its members determine a need for new members. Membership on the board carries responsibilities to attend and participate in meetings of the Board and its committees and to carry forth projects for the corporation.

Members of the current board of directors are: John Clinton (Vice President), Richard Crain (Past-President), Paula Crider, Rodney Dorsey (President), Jose Diaz, Richard Dunscomb (Vice President), Antonio García (Secretary), Corey Graves, Soo Han, Sam Hodson, Mark Kjos, Herman Knoll, Mary Land, Tim Lautzenheiser, Mark Laycock, Lisa MacDonald, Beth Peterson, George Quinlan (Treasurer), and Kevin Sedatole.

== Awards ==
The Midwest Clinic gives out three different awards: the "Medal of Honor," the "Industry Award," and the "International Award." Award winners are nominated and chosen by the Board of Directors. At the 60th anniversary of the Midwest Clinic in 2006, all living past award winners were invited to attend and be honored at the conference. Past award winners include:

Meredith Willson, Medal of Honor, 1964
Doc Severinsen, Medal of Honor, 1969
Morton Gould, Medal of Honor, 1980
John Paynter, Medal of Honor, 1987
Alfred Reed, Medal of Honor, 1996
Jamey Aebersold, Medal of Honor, 2004
William F. Ludwig Jr., Industry Award, 1994
Neil A. Kjos Jr., Industry Award, 1994
Charles Barnhouse, Industry Award, 1997
Frank Bencriscutto, Medal of Honor, 1997
Timothy Reynish, International Award, 1996
Ralph Hultgren, International Award, 2005
