= União Filarmónica do Troviscal =

União Filarmónica do Troviscal is a non-profit society and granted with the title of “Institution of Public Merit” engaging the music's practice and teaching with headquarters in Troviscal (Oliveira do Bairro), Portugal.

== History ==
=== Banda Escolar do Troviscal (1911–1942) ===
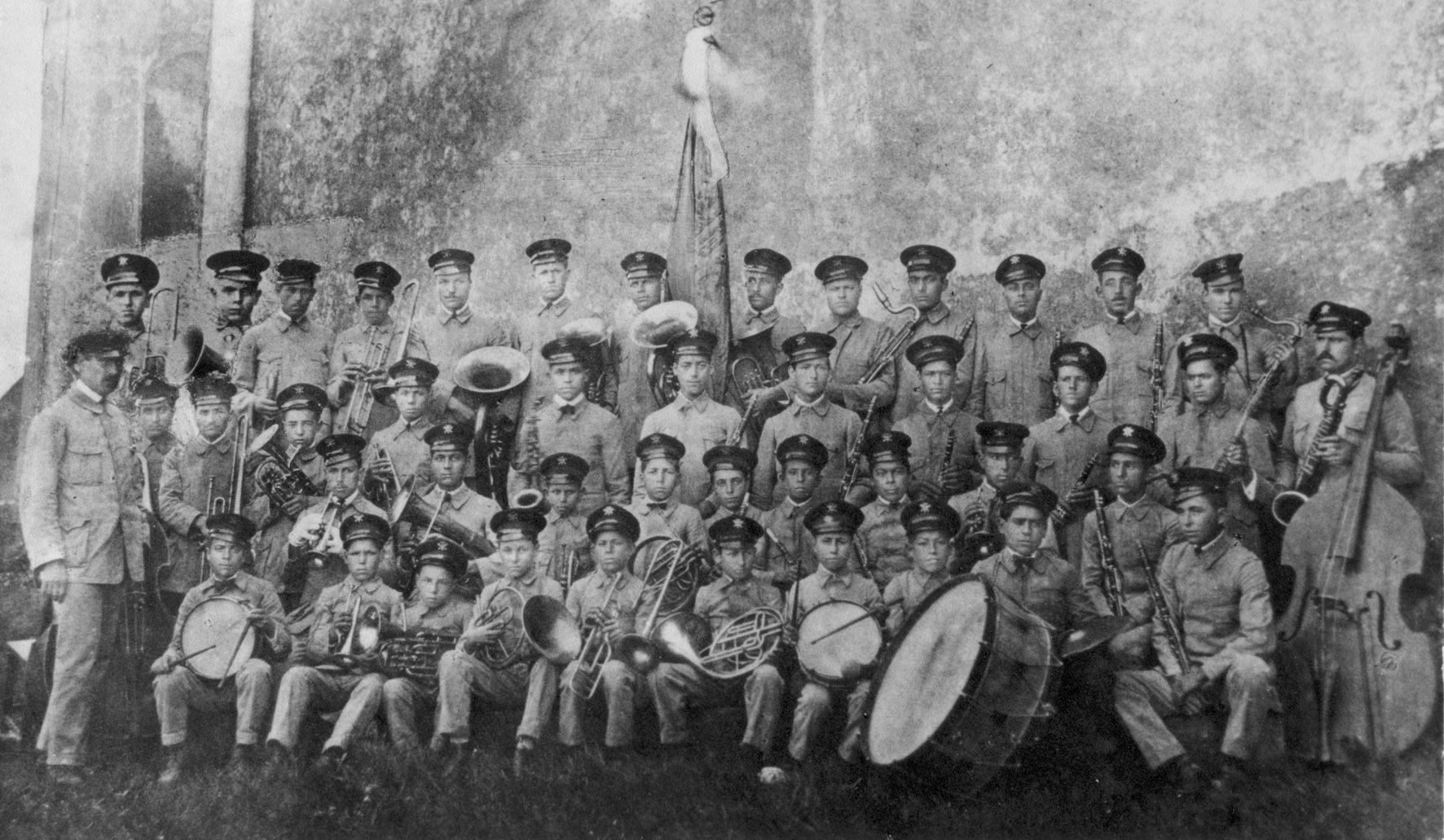
Banda Escolar do Troviscal, Official photo taken in 1915, conducted by José de Oliveira Pinto de Sousa

In 1911, was founded the First Band to exist in Troviscal by an Elementary School teacher, José de Oliveira Pinto de Sousa.

Due to its artistic merit, the Banda Escolar do Troviscal was awarded several prizes in band competitions, gaining high reputation and recognition at national level.

The band also became famous nationwide due to a serious dispute that the band maintained with a despotic catholic prelate, which started with the band’s excommunication by the Bishop of Coimbra in 1922.

This dispute lasted seventeen years and the band became extinct in 1942.

=== União Filarmónica do Troviscal (1989–present) ===
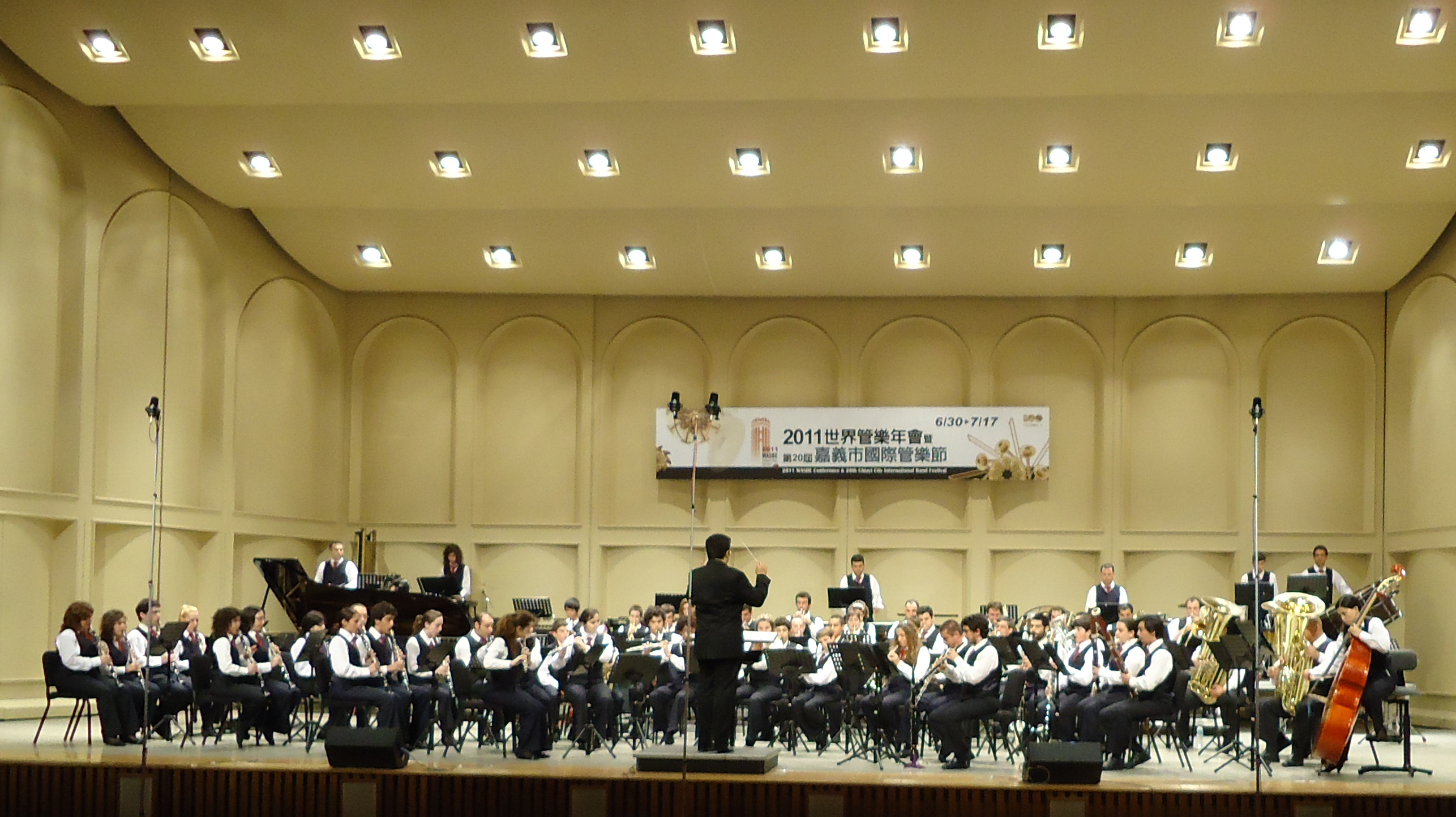
UFT in Concert at the 15th WASBE International Conference, 5th of July 2011, Taiwan

In 1989 a group of local personalities decided to join hands and invite Silas de Oliveira Granjo, a professor and an amateur musician, to establish a non-profit society that would work to restore a wind band in Troviscal.

A music school it's created and the band, now called União Filarmónica do Troviscal, began its regular activity, as any other community wind band in Portugal, with only young children between the ages of six and fourteen.

While maintaining the tradition of outdoor performances, expected from a Portuguese community band (parades, religious processions, outdoor concerts, etc.) the band soon aimed at more artistically oriented targets, participating in several festivals, congresses and being awarded the first prize in international band competitions:

- 9th Purmerade - Internationaal Jeugdmuziekfestival, 1998. First prize with honours in the soloists contest (trumpet)
- 10th Purmerade - Internationaal Jeugdmuziekfestival, 2002. First prize in the concert band contest. Two first prizes with honours (saxophone and trumpet) and two first prizes (flute and clarinet) in the soloists contest
- June 2004, the band represented Portugal in the International Band Festival FIJO' in the Czech city of Cheb.
- First Prize in the II Certamen Internacional de Bandes de Música Vila de la Sénia, 2008.

On 26 September 2010 the band was invited to participate in a TV-show Câmara Clara of 2: channel, entitled Bandas Filarmónicas.

In 2011, becomes the first Portuguese and community band to be selected for a Congress of the World Association for Symphonic Bands and Ensembles (WASBE) by participating in its 15th edition held in Chiayi City, Taiwan.

Since October 2001, the conductor André Filipe Oliveira Granjo is the artistic director.

== Selected discography ==
- 2011 WASBE Chiayi City, Taiwan: Uniao Filarmonica do Troviscal (2011), Editora Mark Records, ASIN: B00668IFQQ. WASBE Concert
- Ratatouille (2010), Editora Cave, ASIN: B004LJY7XC. Ratatouille
