= Timothy Reynish =

English horn player, educator and wind ensemble director

Timothy John Reynish (born Axbridge, 1938) is a conductor of wind bands and wind ensembles, long associated with the Royal Northern College of Music. Through performances, commissions and editions he has significantly expanded the repertoire for ensemble wind players.

Reynish went to school at St Edmund's School in Canterbury. He studied horn with Aubrey Brain and Frank Probyn and was a member of the National Youth Orchestra for six years. He studied music at Cambridge with Raymond Leppard and Sir David Willcocks. Beginning his career as a teacher at Minehead Grammar School (1961–1965), Reynish was appointed horn co-principal of the City of Birmingham Symphony Orchestra from 1965 to 1969. He also played principal horn with the Northern Sinfonia and Sadler's Wells Opera and founded the Birmingham Sinfonietta from members of the CBSO. From 1969 until 1975 he was lecturer in music at Bromsgrove College of Further Education.

He joined the Royal Northern College of Music in 1975 as tutor, and in 1977 succeeded Philip Jones as head of the School of Wind & Percussion, staying there until his retirement in 2001. During that time he developed the wind orchestra and ensemble of the RNCM, commissioning new works from composers including Richard Rodney Bennett, John Casken, Adam Gorb, Kenneth Hesketh, Thea Musgrave and Aulis Sallinen. He also conducted many of the opera productions at the RNCM. Since 2001 Reynish has continued to be active as a lecturer and conductor, particularly in the UK and the USA.

Reynish founded the British Association of Symphonic Bands and Wind Ensembles in 1981. He has been editor of the Novello Wind Band & Ensemble series and an editor with Maecenas Music. He contributed the chapter on the wind music of Percy Grainger to The New Percy Grainger Companion, published by Boydell & Brewer. In 2022 he self-published Making it Better: Creating a Wind Repertoire in the UK, which details many of his commissions.

Reynish was awarded an MBE for services to music in 2019.
