= Association of Concert Bands =

Association of Concert Bands (ACB) is an organization of bands, individuals, and corporations who are endowed with the means and desire to serve the needs of adult instrumental musicians who perform in and lead community concert bands. The ACB is a not-for-profit New York State corporation founded in August 1977, and originally named the Association of Concert Bands of America (ACBA).

The mission of ACB is to encourage and foster the adult concert community, and those interested in municipal and civic bands. It also promotes the performance of the highest quality traditional and contemporary literature for band. Additionally, ACB is active in various projects and goals, such as the Band Builder's Manual for information on the establishment, funding, development, maintenance, and promotion of bands in the world community and the Tommy Guilbert Fund to encourage young musicians to continue musical experiences throughout their lives. The ACB also keeps a database of all music commissioned by community bands.

The Association holds an annual convention where members share personal views and experiences, and benefit from educational seminars and musical performances. The 2016 convention was hosted by the East Winds Symphonic Band in Pittsburgh, Pennsylvania, and the 2017 convention in Ft. Lauderdale, Florida. The 2018 convention is hosted by the Buffalo Niagara Concert Band in Buffalo, New York.

The Sousa Archives and Center for American Music holds a collection containing the ACB's administrative files, convention and concert programs, photographs, and sound recordings.
