= List of Eastman School of Music people =

This is list of notable alumni, faculty and staff of the Eastman School of Music.

== Alumni ==
- Martin Amlin, composer and pianist
- Dominick Argento, composer
- Sasami Ashworth, singer
- Martha Atwell, radio director
- James Austin, trumpeter and educator
- Angelo Badalamenti, film and television composer
- Mark Bailey, conductor
- Nicholson Baker, author
- John Balme, conductor
- Jeff Beal, composer
- Bob Becker, percussionist and composer
- Frank Bencriscutto, conductor and composer
- Roger Bobo, tubist
- Bonita Boyd, flutist
- Horace Clarence Boyer, scholar
- Rosemarie Brancato, soprano
- Jeff Briggs, video game developer
- Cardon V. Burnham, composer
- Nicole Cabell, soprano
- Ron Carter, jazz musician
- Pamela Coburn (born 1959), soprano
- Alexander Courage, television composer
- Paul Crawford, jazz musician, music historian
- Bill Cunliffe, Grammy Award-winning composer, arranger, jazz pianist
- Charles Daellenbach, CM, co-founder of Canadian Brass
- David Daniels, conductor and author
- Leonardo De Lorenzo, flautist, first flute instructor at the Eastman School of Music
- Robert deMaine, cellist
- David Diamond, composer
- Emma Lou Diemer, composer
- Steven Doane, cellist
- Doriot Anthony Dwyer, flautist, first woman named to principal chair of a major US orchestra
- Enrico Elisi, pianist
- Bradley Ellingboe, composer, professor
- Katia Escalera, soprano
- Eric Ewazen, composer
- Frederick Fennell, conductor
- John Ferguson, organist, church musician and composer
- David Finck, jazz bassist
- Pamela Fleming, trumpeter, composer
- Renée Fleming, soprano
- Dave Flippo, jazz composer, pianist, vocalist
- Cynthia Folio, flutist, theorist, composer
- Steve Gadd, jazz musician, session drummer
- Julia Gaines, percussionist
- Crawford Gates, composer, conductor
- Ayşedeniz Gökçin, pianist
- Jonas Gray, bassoonist and digital entrepreneur
- Diana Haskell, clarinetist
- Jon Hassell, composer and improviser
- Christos Hatzis, composer
- Scott Healy, Grammy–nominated composer and keyboardist
- Yoshihisa Hirano, anime composer
- Bernard Hoffer, composer and conductor
- Karen Holvik, soprano
- Katherine Hoover, composer, flutist, educator, author
- Warren Hull, actor and television personality
- Donald Hunsberger, conductor
- Jon Hynes, pianist
- Michael Isaacson, Jewish music composer
- Aaron James, organist
- Guy Johnston, cellist (BBC Young Musician of the Year, 2000)
- Richard Joiner, clarinetist
- Mark Kellogg, trombonist
- Donald Kendrick, choir director, organist
- Chosei Komatsu, conductor
- Gail Kubik, composer
- JoAnn Kuchera-Morin, researcher
- John La Montaine, composer
- Kay Lande, composer and singer
- William P. Latham, composer
- Judith LeClair, bassoonist
- Tony Levin, rock-fusion bassist
- Scott Lindroth, composer
- David Liptak, composer
- Joseph Locke, jazz percussionist
- Michael Lowenstern, clarinetist and bass clarinetist
- Bob Ludwig, mastering engineer
- Eileen Malone, harpist
- Eric Mandat, clarinetist and composer
- Chuck Mangione, jazz musician
- Christopher Martin, trumpet
- Ailbhe McDonagh, cellist and composer
- John McKay, pianist
- Thomas Meglioranza, baritone
- Marc Mellits, composer
- Mitch Miller, record producer
- Madeleine Mitchell, violinist
- Erin Morley, operatic soprano
- Robert Morris, composer, theorist
- Lee Musiker, arranger
- Gerry Niewood, saxophonist
- John Oddo, arranger
- Paul Parmelee, pianist
- Robert Paterson, composer
- Scott Perkins, choral composer
- Jim Pugh, trombonist
- Kevin Puts, composer, 2012 Pulitzer Prize winner, 2023 Grammy Award winner
- Lance Reddick, actor
- Bill Reichenbach Jr., Hollywood trombonist
- Tim Riley, music critic
- Catherine Rodland, organist
- Laurence Rosenthal, Emmy–winning film composer
- Vladimir Rosing, opera director, tenor; founded Opera Department in 1923
- Margaret Vardell Sandresky, composer
- Ralph Sauer, trombonist
- Mark Davis Scatterday, conductor
- Kim Scharnberg, composer, arranger, conductor, record producer
- Maria Schneider, Grammy-winning composer and big band leader
- John Serry Jr., Grammy-nominated jazz pianist and composer
- Christian Sinding, Norwegian composer and teacher at Eastman School of Music
- Fenwick Smith, flautist
- SNMNMNM, Indie rock band
- Lew Soloff, trumpeter, composer, actor, Grammy Award for Album of the Year
- D. J. Sparr, composer and electric guitar soloist
- Damin Spritzer, organist and academic
- Maurice Stern, tenor
- Leigh Howard Stevens, marimba soloist
- Eileen Strempel, soprano and dean of UCLA Herb Alpert School of Music
- Byron Stripling, jazz trumpeter
- Charles Strouse, composer
- Jessica Suchy-Pilalis, harpist, Byzantine singer and composer
- Carole Terry, organist
- Christopher Theofanidis, composer
- Michael Torke, composer
- Cynthia Johnston Turner, conductor
- Jeff Tyzik, composer and conductor
- Allen Vizzutti, trumpeter and composer
- Mark Volpe, president and CEO of Boston Symphony Orchestra
- George Vosburgh, trumpeter
- George Walker, composer
- Michael Walsh, music critic, novelist and screenwriter
- Leehom Wang, singer-songwriter and record producer
- Robert Ward, opera composer
- William Warfield, baritone
- Claire Watson, soprano
- Helen L. Weiss, composer
- Norma Wendelburg, composer
- Alec Wilder, composer
- Clifton Williams, composer
- John Williams, composer, conductor, pianist
- Dana Wilson, composer
- Todd Wilson, organist
- Pieter Wispelwey, cellist
- Craig M. Wright, music historian and professor at Yale University
- Robert Wykes, composer and professor at Washington University in St. Louis
- John Wyre, composer and percussionist
- Sherry Zannoth, soprano
- Jeffrey Zeigler, cellist

== Faculty ==
The Eastman School has more than 130 faculty members, including internationally renowned performers, composers, conductors, scholars, and educators. In addition, many highly acclaimed musicians and scholars visit the school each year to give master classes and guest lectures or to serve as visiting faculty members.

- Samuel Adler, composition
- John H. Beck, percussion
- Warren Benson, composition
- Bonita Boyd, flute
- David Burge, piano
- Charles Castleman, violin
- Katherine Ciesinski, voice
- David Craighead, organ
- Robert De Cormier, choral conductor
- Jan De Gaetani, voice
- Leonardo De Lorenzo, flute
- David Effron, orchestral conductor
- Sara Gazarek, voice
- Frank Glazer, piano
- Harold Gleason, organ
- Nicholas Goluses, guitar
- Anthony Dean Griffey, voice
- Arthur Hartmann, violin
- Stanley Hasty, clarinet
- David Higgs, organ
- Donald Hunsberger, wind ensemble conductor
- Mark Kellogg, euphonium & trombone
- Henry Klumpenhouwer, music theory
- Alexander Kobrin, piano
- Oleh Krysa, violin
- W. Peter Kurau, horn
- Ralph P. Locke, musicologist
- Eileen Malone, harp
- Jon Manasse, clarinet
- Chuck Mangione, jazz ensemble
- John Marcellus, trombone
- Paul O'Dette, lute, early music
- Thomas Paul, voice
- Emory Remington, trombone
- Mendi Rodan, orchestral conductor
- Carlos Sanchez-Gutierrez, composition
- Joseph Schwantner, composition
- Brooks Smith, piano
- Yi-Kwei Sze, voice
- K. David van Hoesen, bassoon
- Ruth Taiko Watanabe, music librarian
- Marion Weed, voice
- Rayburn Wright, jazz and contemporary media
- Zvi Zeitlin, violin
- Oscar Zimmerman, double bass
