= Nespoli =

Nespoli is an Italian surname. Notable people with the surname include:

- Gian Luigi Nespoli (1936–2007), Italian-born Cuban poet and writer
- Mauro Nespoli (born 1987), Italian archer
- Paolo Nespoli (born 1957), Italian astronaut and engineer
- Uriel Nespoli (1884–1973), Italian conductor

== See also ==
- 12405 Nespoli, a main-belt asteroid
