= David Stabler =

American journalist and music critic (1952–2025)

- Born: David Charles Stabler; October 12, 1952; Middletown, Connecticut, U.S.
- Died: September 17, 2025 (aged 72)
- Education: University of Western Ontario; Eastman School of Music

David Charles Stabler (October 12, 1952 – September 17, 2025) was an American arts reporter and music critic for The Oregonian.

== Early life and education ==
Stabler and his brother were raised by a Wesleyan University professor and a homemaker in Middletown, Connecticut. Stabler earned degrees in piano performance from the University of Western Ontario and the Eastman School of Music. His teacher there was Damjana Bratuž.

== Career ==
Stabler was a finalist for the Pulitzer Prize for Feature Writing in 2003. In 2012, he won second place in the Arts and Entertainment category of the Best of the West contest for his profile of Carlos Kalmar during his tenure as musical director of the Oregon Symphony.

== Death ==
Stabler died from acute myeloid leukemia on September 17, 2025, at the age of 72.

== See also ==
- List of Eastman School of Music people
- List of University of Western Ontario people
