= James Austin (musician) =

American trumpeter and teacher

James Lyle Austin (born November 29, 1937) is an American trumpeter and teacher.

Austin earned his undergraduate degree from the Eastman School of Music, where he was featured as trumpet and cornet soloist on many of the recordings of the Eastman Wind Ensemble under the direction of Frederick Fennell. Before completing his studies at Eastman, he accepted an offer from Leopold Stokowski to become the principal trumpet of the Houston Symphony, effective following his graduation. He continued in this position from 1960 to 1977, under the direction of several orchestral conductors including Stokowski, André Previn, John Barbirolli, and Lawrence Foster. Simultaneously, he served as principal trumpet in the Houston Grand Opera Orchestra and the Houston Chamber Orchestra.

Austin has enjoyed a long association with the University of Houston Moores School of Music, where he is currently Professor Emeritus and previously served as Professor of Trumpet from 1960 to 2009. His students hold positions in the orchestras of Calgary, Vancouver, Houston, San Antonio, Dallas, and Louisville. In addition, many of his students have become noted teachers in their own right in many different colleges and universities, high schools, and private studios.

Austin currently resides in southwest Houston and enjoys a growing private trumpet teaching practice.
