= RAI National Symphony Orchestra =

Italian symphony radio orchestra

- Orchestra
- Official logo (2017)
- Native name: Orchestra Sinfonica Nazionale della RAI
- Founded: 1994; 32 years ago
- Location: Turin, Italy
- Concert hall: Auditorium RAI
- Principal conductor: Andrés Orozco-Estrada
- Website: Official website

The RAI National Symphony Orchestra (Italian: Orchestra Sinfonica Nazionale della RAI) is an Italian symphony radio orchestra, owned by the public radio and television company RAI. Its primary concert venue is the Auditorium RAI in the Piazza Rossaro in Turin. Its concerts are broadcast on Rai Radio 3. The current artistic director is Ernesto Schiavi.

The orchestra was formed in 1994 by the merger of four former RAI orchestras of Turin, Milan, Rome, and Naples, which had been founded starting in 1931.

== History ==
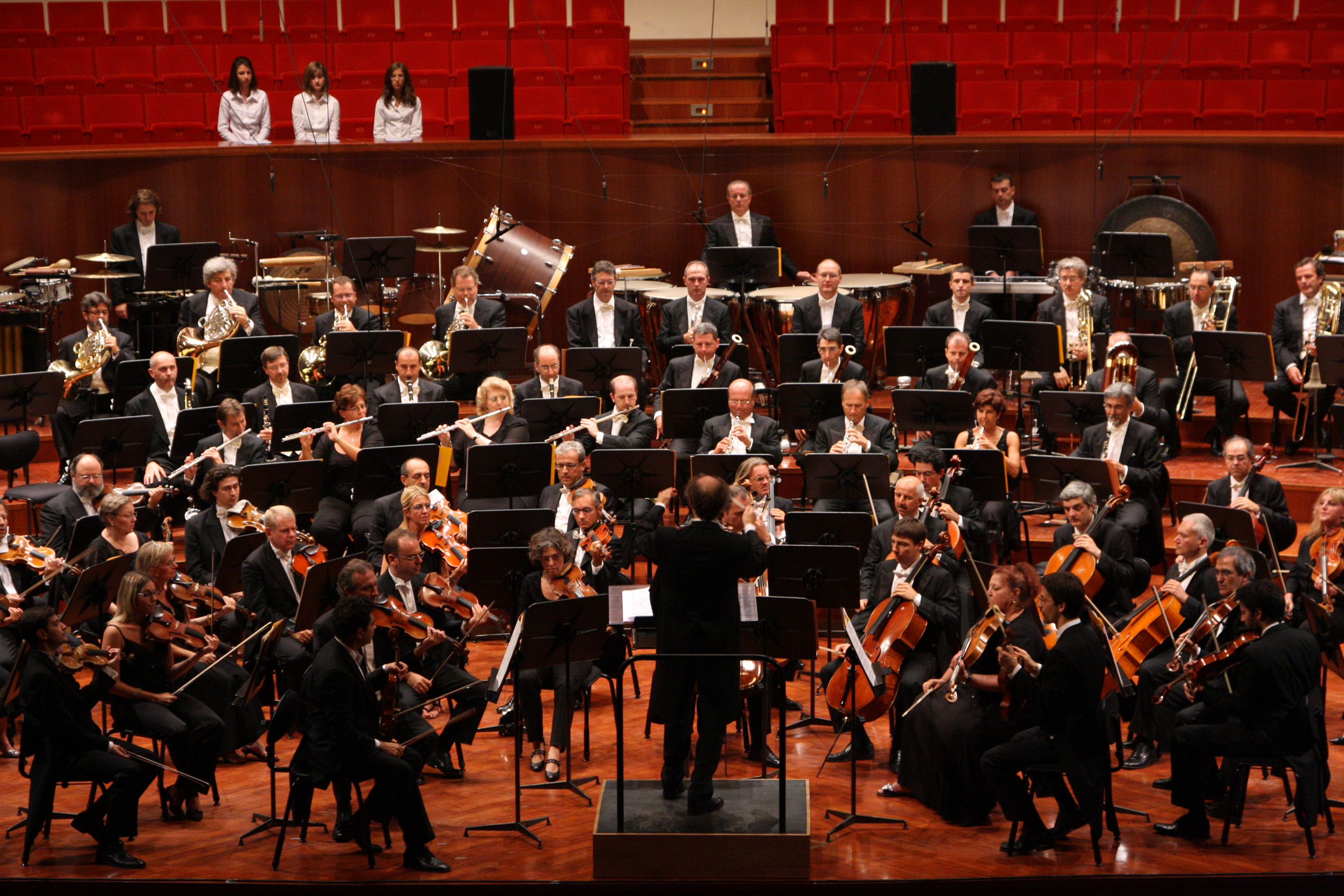
The orchestra performing at the annual MITO SettembreMusica festival in September 2008

In 1931, the EIAR, Italy's newly formed public radio authority, founded its first symphony orchestra in Turin. Subsequent radio orchestras were established in Rome (1936), Milan (1950) and Naples (1948, integrated to the RAI in 1956).

In 1994, the RAI merged its four orchestras (RAI Symphony Orchestra of Turin, RAI Symphony Orchestra of Rome, RAI Symphony Orchestra of Milan, and RAI Alessandro Scarlatti Chamber Orchestra of Naples) to form the national orchestra, based in Turin. The new ensemble's opening concerts were led by Georges Prêtre and Giuseppe Sinopoli.

From 1996 to 2001, Eliahu Inbal held the title of Direttore onorario (honorary conductor) of the orchestra. Jeffrey Tate was principal guest conductor of the orchestra from 1998 to 2002, and had the title of Direttore onorario until July 2011. Rafael Frühbeck de Burgos was principal conductor of the orchestra from 2001 to 2007. Gianandrea Noseda was principal guest conductor from 2003 to 2006. From 2009 to 2016, Juraj Valčuha was principal conductor of the orchestra.

James Conlon first guest-conducted the orchestra in 2009. In June 2015, the orchestra announced the appointment of Conlon as its next principal conductor, effective with the 2016–2017 season. In May 2021, the orchestra announced the appointments of Fabio Luisi as its conductor emeritus and of Robert Treviño as its next principal guest conductor. Treviño's contract is for 3 years.

Andrés Orozco-Estrada first guest-conducted the orchestra in May 2022. On the basis of this appearance, the orchestra announced the appointment of Orozco-Estrada as its next principal conductor, effective October 2023, with an initial contract of three seasons. Orozco-Estrada is scheduled to stand down from the orchestra at the close of the 2025-2026 season.

Michele Mariotti first guest-conducted the orchestra in January 2011. In February 2026, the orchestra announced the appointment of Mariotti as its next principal conductor, effective in October 2026, with an initial contract of three seasons. Mariotti is the first Italian conductor to be named principal conductor of the RAI National Symphony Orchestra.

== Principal conductors ==
- Rafael Frühbeck de Burgos (2001–2007)
- Juraj Valčuha (2009–2016)
- James Conlon (2016–2020)
- Andrés Orozco-Estrada (2023–present)
