= Olga Samaroff =

American pianist (1880–1948)

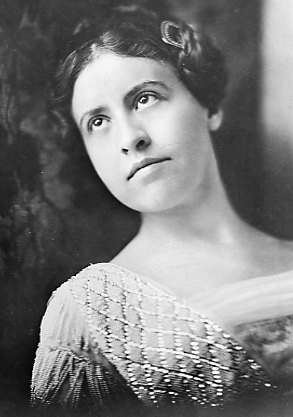
- Born: Lucy Mary Agnes Hickenlooper; August 8, 1880; San Antonio, Texas, U.S.
- Died: May 17, 1948 (aged 67); New York City, U.S.
- Occupations: Classical pianist; piano pedagogue; music critic
- Spouses: Boris Loutzky (divorced) Leopold Stokowski (m. 1911; div. 1923)
- Children: 1

External audio
- You may listen to Olga Samaroff performing Franz Liszt's Liebesträume No. 3 in A Flat Major in 1921 and her arrangement of Johann Sebastian Bach's Fugue in G minor, BWV 578 in 1931 here on archive.org

Olga Samaroff (born Lucy Mary Agnes Hickenlooper; August 8, 1880 – May 17, 1948) was an American pianist, music critic, and teacher. Among her teachers was Charles-Valentin Alkan's son, Élie-Miriam Delaborde. Her second husband was the conductor Leopold Stokowski.

Samaroff was also a prominent member of the Philadelphia Art Alliance.

== Early life and education ==
Samaroff was born on August 8, 1880 in San Antonio, Texas, the daughter of Jane (Loening) and Carlos Hickenlooper. She grew up in Galveston, where her family owned a business later wiped out in the 1900 Galveston hurricane. She began studying with her grandmother, and, after her talent for the piano was discovered, she was sent to Europe to study, since at that time there were no great piano teachers in the United States. She was the first American woman to win entrance to the piano class at Paris' Conservatoire Nationale de Musique. She first studied with Antoine François Marmontel and Charles-Valentin Alkan's son, Élie-Miriam Delaborde, at the Conservatoire de Paris, and later with Ernst Jedliczka in Berlin. It was in Europe that she made the acquaintance of longtime friend and influential opera singer Geraldine Farrar.

== Career ==
After her divorce and the 1900 hurricane that claimed her family's business, she returned to the United States and tried to carve out a career as a pianist. She soon discovered she was hampered by both her awkward name and her American origins. Her agent suggested a professional name change, which was claimed to be taken from a remote relative.

As Olga Samaroff, she self-produced her New York debut at Carnegie Hall in 1905 (the first woman ever to do so). She hired the hall, the orchestra, and conductor Walter Damrosch, and made an overwhelming impression with her performance of Tchaikovsky's Piano Concerto No. 1 and the Schumann Piano Concerto. She played extensively in the United States and Europe thereafter.

Samaroff discovered Leopold Stokowski (1882–1977) when he was church organist at St. Bartholomew's in New York and later conductor of the Cincinnati Symphony Orchestra. She played Tchaikovsky's Piano Concerto No. 1 under Stokowski's direction when he made his official conducting debut in Paris with the Colonne Orchestra on May 12, 1909.

She married Stokowski in 1911, and their daughter Sonya was born in 1921. At that time, Samaroff was much more famous than her husband and was able to lobby her contacts to get Stokowski appointed in 1912 to the vacant conductor's post at the Philadelphia Orchestra, thus launching his international career. Samaroff made a number of recordings in the early 1920s for the Victor Talking Machine Company. She was the second pianist in history, after Hans von Bülow, to perform all 32 Beethoven piano sonatas in public, preceding Artur Schnabel (who did the series in 1927) by several years. German pianist Walter Gieseking also performed the complete sonatas in public by age 15 (c. 1910).

In January 1917, when the Philadelphia Art Alliance launched a new series of "sociable luncheons" to familiarize prominent men and women in the Philadelphia region with fine arts and music trends, the organization's leaders chose Samaroff to be the series' first speaker. Well known to the alliance and residents of the Philadelphia region from her work on the alliance's music committee, as well as from her performance career, she presented a lecture on "The Correlation of Music and the Fine Arts."

In 1923, Samaroff and Stokowski divorced; the reasons included Stokowski's infidelity, from which she never recovered. She took refuge in her friends, among whom were George Gershwin, Irving Berlin, Dorothy Parker, and Cary Grant. In 1925, Samaroff fell in her New York apartment and suffered a shoulder injury that forced her to retire from performing. From that point on, she worked primarily as a critic and teacher. She wrote for the New York Evening Post until 1928 - the first woman to serve as music critic for a New York daily newspaper - and gave guest lectures throughout the 1930s.

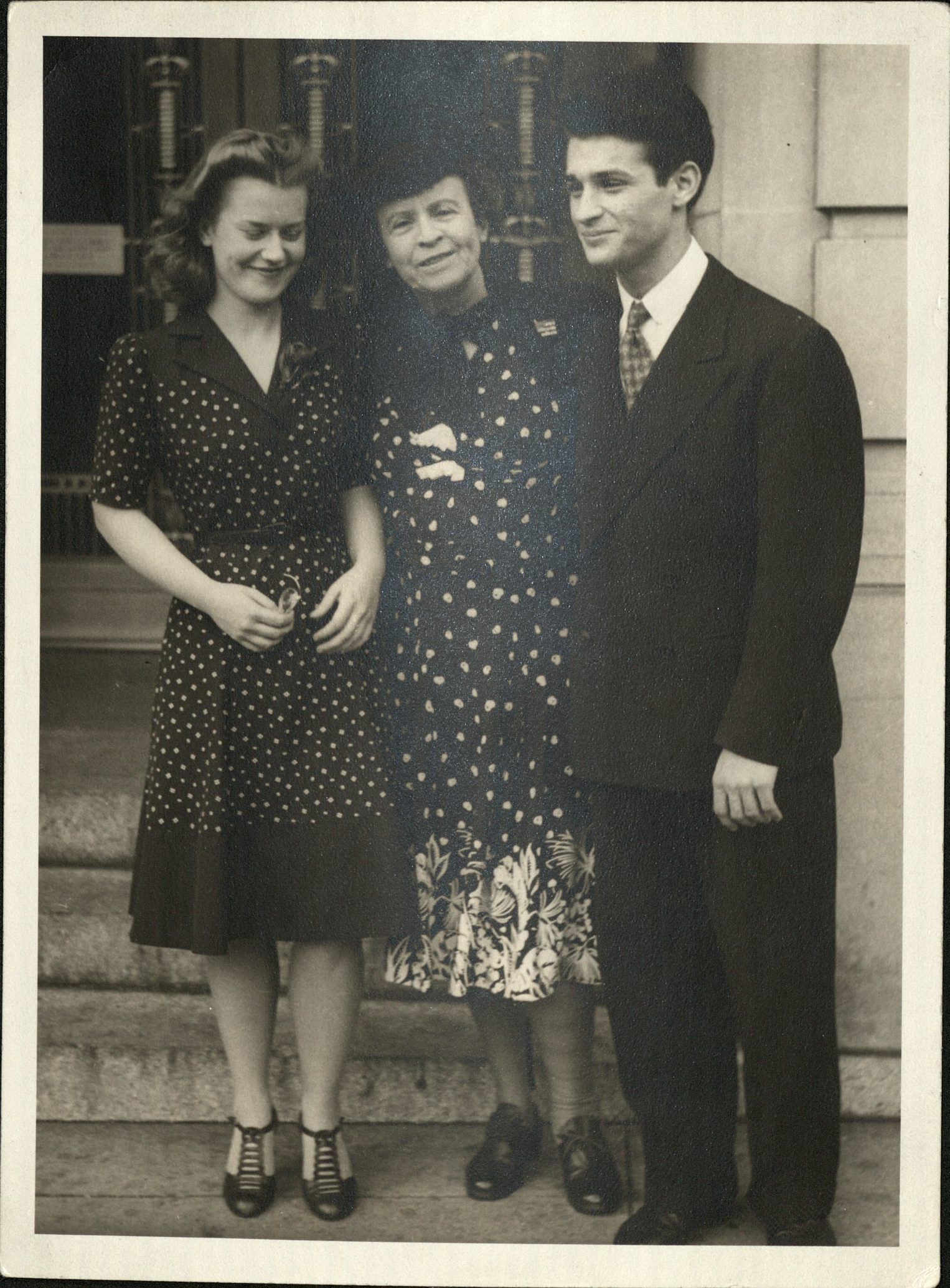
Olga Samaroff (center) with students Solveig Lunde and William Kapell (courtesy of Solveig Lunde Madsen)

Samaroff developed a course of music study for laymen and was the first music teacher to be broadcast on NBC television. She taught at the Philadelphia Conservatory of Music and in 1924 was invited to join the faculty of the newly formed Juilliard School in New York, becoming the first American-born teacher on the piano faculty. She taught at both schools for the rest of her life. Called "Madam" by her students, she was an advocate for them, supplying many of her Depression-era charges with concert clothes and food, or helping to subsidize their rent or letting them live with her in her New York apartment. She also pressed officials at Juilliard to build a dormitory – a project that was not realized until after her death decades later. Her most famous pupil was concert pianist William Kapell, who was killed in a 1953 plane crash at age 31. She herself said that the best pianist she ever taught was the New Zealander Richard Farrell, who also died at age 31, in a motor vehicle accident in England in 1958.

== Death ==
Samaroff published an autobiography, An American Musician's Story, in 1939. She died of a heart attack at her home on 24 West 55th Street in New York on the evening of May 17, 1948, after giving several lessons that day.

== Personal life ==
While in Berlin, she was very briefly married to Russian engineer Boris Loutzky.

Samaroff is related to Civil War general Andrew Hickenlooper and to Colorado Governor John Hickenlooper. In John Hickenlooper's 2016 memoir, he states that the name change from Hickenlooper to Samaroff was suggested by Samaroff's cousin and federal judge Smith Hickenlooper.

== Notable pupils ==
- Richard Farrell
- Ines Gomez Carrillo (es)
- Stewart L. Gordon
- Edith Grosz
- Natalie Hinderas
- Bruce Hungerford
- William Kapell
- Martin Canin
- Raymond Lewenthal
- Eugene List
- Jerome Lowenthal
- Paul Parmelee
- Margaret Saunders Ott
- Vincent Persichetti
- Thomas Schippers
- Claudette Sorel
- Alfred Teltschik
- Rosalyn Tureck
- Alexis Weissenberg
- Isabelle Yalkovsky Byman
- Solveig Lunde Madsen
