= Tokyo Kosei Wind Orchestra =

Professional concert band in Japan

- Concert Band
- Native name: Japanese: 東京佼成ウインドオーケストラ, romanized: Tōkyō Kōsei Uindo Ōkesutora
- Short name: TKWO
- Founded: 1960 (66 years ago)
- Location: Tokyo, Japan
- Concert hall: Fumon Hall
- Principal conductor: Conductor Laureate; Frederick Fennell; Conductor; Takeshi Ooi; Special Guest Conductor; Thomas Sanderling; Principal Guest Conductor; Norichika Iimori; Pops Director; Koichi Fujino Previous Conductors; Paul Meyer (Principal Conductor); Douglas Bostock (Permanent Conductor / Principal Guest Conductor)
- Website: www.tkwo.jp

The Tokyo Kosei Wind Orchestra (東京佼成ウインドオーケストラ, Tōkyō Kōsei Uindo Ōkesutora; abbreviated TKWO) is a professional concert band based in Tokyo, Japan. TKWO has been called Japan's premiere wind ensemble, one of the most influential Japanese wind bands, and one of the world's leading professional civilian wind bands.

== History ==
TKWO was established by Kohno Kozo in 1960 in association with the lay-Buddhist organization Rissho Kosei Kai. Kohno, who was previously enrolled in the Toyama Academy Military Band of the Japanese Army, proposed the idea to the group's founder, Niwano Nikkyo, as a worship group. Originally known as the Tokyo Kosei Symphonic Band, it served as a ceremonial consort, with every member participating in Rissho Kosei-kai. Kiboni Moete served as the band's conductor, while Kohno joined as an administrator. The band was renamed in 1973 as its membership and profile grew. Kohno would retire from TKWO in 1979 but continued to work in educational programs for children through music in Rissho Kosei-kai until his death on August 22, 1996.

The orchestra was further developed by American conductor and founder of the Eastman Wind Ensemble, Frederick Fennell. Fennell, originally a guest conductor for the orchestra, formally joined as a permanent instructor in 1984. Fennell is credited with increasing the band's recording output, diversity in performed compositions, and its reputation for touring performances in schools.

Fennell left his conducting position in 1994, but remained as music director until 2000 and conductor laureate until his death in 2004. He was replaced by Douglas Bostock in 2000 and by Paul Meyer in 2009. As of 2014, Takeshi Ooi is the conductor.

== Operation ==
TKWO's headquarters are located on the Rissho Kosei-kai campus in central Tokyo, close to Fumon Hall, their primary recording venue. TKWO's finances are supervised by the Rissho Kosei-kai, providing financial support during local and regional concerts.

TKWO has hired women as members in the upper brass, woodwinds, and percussion sections, as well as promoting pieces by Japanese women composers, including Chieko Arai and Etsuko Hori.

== Discography and Style ==
TKWO has recorded more than 130 albums, commissioned numerous original works, sponsored band festivals and school clinics, and toured internationally with guest conductors such as Arnald Gabriel, Robert Jager, Craig Kirchhoff, and Alfred Reed. American reviewer Ron McDonald called the Tokyo Kosei Wind Orchestra recordings "one of the major releases of the decade" and "almost an encyclopedic survey of symphonic wind music."

TKWO employs guest conductors from the United States and Europe. Most of TKWO's performed pieces are of Western origin, with Fennell's tenure marking a shift towards original works by American composers.

== Impact and Outreach ==
TKWO is well-known for its involvement in local schools. TKWO sponsors band workshops and gives outreach to schools, being one of the most important models for school bands within Kansai. Fennell was a strong proponent of regular tours while he conducted TKWO.

Ray Cramer, an American band conductor, stated that few wind ensembles existed when he first started conducting in Japan and that the popularity of TKWO started the trend of smaller instrumentation over the then-preferred large symphonic groups.
