= Donald Hunsberger =

American conductor and arranger (1932–2023)

Donald R. Hunsberger
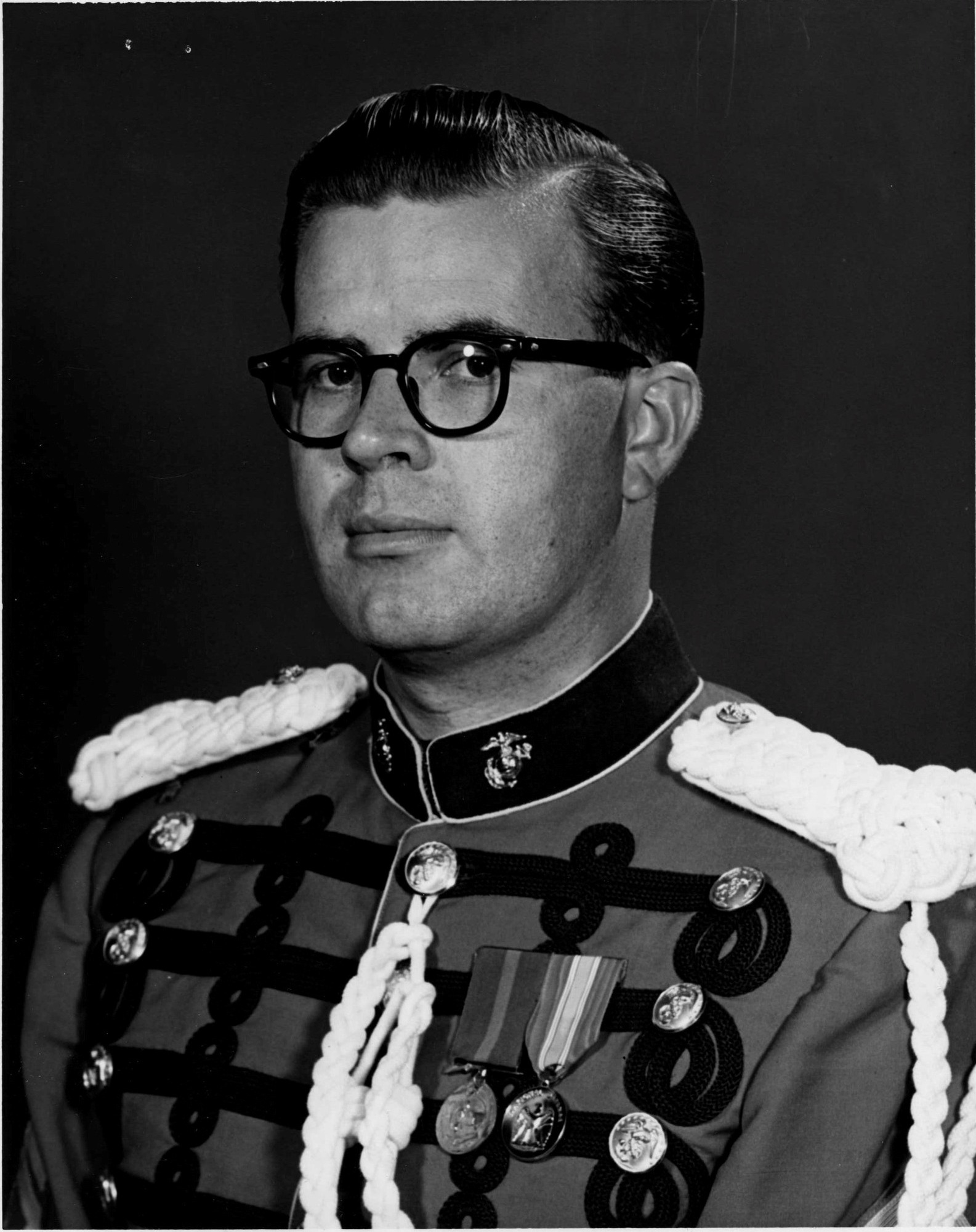
- Hunsberger in the 1950s, during his tenure in the United States Marine Band.

Background information
- Born: Donald Ross Hunsberger; August 2, 1932; Souderton, Pennsylvania, U.S.
- Died: November 5, 2023 (aged 91) Pittsford, New York, U.S.
- Instrument: Trombone
- Military career
- Education: Eastman School of Music
- Allegiance: United States
- Branch: United States Marine Corps
- Service years: 1954–1958
- Rank: Staff sergeant
- Unit: United States Marine Band
- Conflicts: Second inauguration of Dwight D. Eisenhower

Donald Ross Hunsberger (August 2, 1932 – November 5, 2023) was an American conductor and arranger. He served as the conductor of the Eastman Wind Ensemble from 1965 until 2002. He also held the position of Professor of conducting at the Eastman School of Music. Generally regarded as a key contributor to the rise of the modern wind ensemble in the twentieth century, Hunsberger's notable contributions include conducting, recording, and arranging music for winds, namely his arrangement of the Marines' Hymn. He was also a member of the United States Marine Band during the 1950s.

== Early life and education ==
Hunsberger was born on August 2, 1932, in Souderton, Pennsylvania and attended the Eastman School of Music in New York.

== Career ==
From 1954 to 1958, Hunsberger was a member of the United States Marine Band, where he served as an arranger and trombone soloist, reaching the rank of staff sergeant. During this time, he composed an arrangement of the "Marines' Hymn", which is often performed by the Marine Band today, and he performed at the second inauguration of Dwight D. Eisenhower in 1957.

In 1962, he was appointed conductor of the Eastman Symphony Band and coordinator of the Instrumental Ensemble Program. In 1965, following the departure of Clyde Roller, Hunsberger was appointed as conductor of the Eastman Wind Ensemble, which had been created by Frederick Fennell. During his tenure with the Eastman Wind Ensemble, Hunsberger conducted many recordings, including some with trumpeter Wynton Marsalis. Through his work as a conductor, author, and recording artist, Hunsberger helped further the principles of the wind ensemble concept, including "specified instrumentation, the orchestral concept of performance, single performer approach [and] development of individual tone colors.". From 1985 to 1987, Hunsberger served as the president of the College Band Directors National Association.

=== Arrangements and published works ===
Hunsberger's 1956 arrangement of the "Marines' Hymn", played by the 2nd Marine Division Band.

Hunsberger also arranged transcriptions of orchestral music for concert band. Among these include: Shostakovich's Festive Overture; Kabalevsky's Colas Breugnon Overture, Grafulla's Echoes of the 1860s, Khachaturian's Ballet Suite from Spartacus, and John Williams' Star Wars Trilogy. Hunsberger was also the editor for the Remington Warm-Up Series. Hunsberger co-authored a book with Roy Ernst called The Art of Conducting, wrote a newsletter for MCA Music on Wind Ensemble Music, and many other articles. In 1994 he co-edited a book with Frank J. Cipolla called The Wind Ensemble and Its Repertoire: Essays on the Fortieth Anniversary of the Eastman Wind Ensemble.

== Later life and death ==
In later years, Hunsberger rescored music for silent films, and conducted performances with major symphony orchestras. Until his death, Hunsberger was conductor emeritus of the Eastman Wind Ensemble.

Hunsberger died in Pittsford, New York, on November 5, 2023, at the age of 91.

== Selected bibliography ==
- Cipolla, Frank J., and Donald Hunsberger, eds. The Wind Band in and Around New York CA. 1830–1950. Belwin-Mills, 2007. OCLC 156833235
- Cipolla, Frank J., and Donald Hunsberger, eds. The Wind Ensemble and Its Repertoire: Essays on the Fortieth Anniversary of the Eastman Wind Ensemble. University of Rochester Press, 1994. OCLC 961455544
- Hunsberger, Donald. "Wind Band: Here Today - Where Tomorrow? Music Journal 26:10 (December 1968), 36. ISSN 0027-4364 (reprints); OCLC 317215434; OCLC 3612480 (microform)
- Hunsberger, Donald, and Roy Ernst. The Art of Conducting. New York: Alfred A. Knopf, 1983. OCLC 906415812

== Selected discography ==
- Eastman Wind Ensemble, Donald Hunsberger, conductor. American Music for Symphonic Winds. Decca DL 710163, 1968. OCLC 810336112
- Eastman Wind Ensemble, Donald Hunsberger, conductor. Homespun America (three record set). Vox Box SVBX 5309, 1976. OCLC 1004127171, 28763671
- Eastman Wind Ensemble, Donald Hunsberger, conductor/arranger, Wynton Marsalis, cornet soloist. Carnaval. CBS Masterworks IM421137, 1986. OCLC 320499390
- Eastman Wind Ensemble, Donald Hunsberger, conductor. Live in Osaka. Sony Music SK47198, 1990. OCLC 725015677, 1127491818, 972850934

Cultural offices
Preceded by A. Clyde Roller	Conductor of the Eastman Wind Ensemble; 1965–2001	Succeeded by Mark Scatterday
