= Andrés Orozco-Estrada =

Colombian conductor (born 1977)

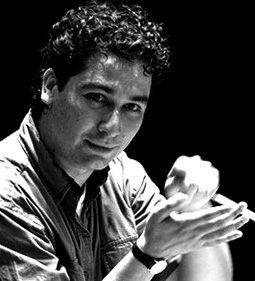
- Born: 14 December 1977 (age 48); Medellín, Colombia
- Occupation: Conductor
- Organizations: Houston Symphony; hr-Sinfonieorchester; Gürzenich Orchestra Cologne; RAI Symphony Orchestra; Swedish Radio Symphony Orchestra
- Spouse: Julia Orozco-Estrada

Andrés Orozco-Estrada (born 14 December 1977) is a Colombian violinist and conductor, with dual nationality in Colombia and Austria. He is principal conductor of the RAI National Symphony Orchestra, Generalmusikdirektor of the Gürzenich Orchester and Cologne Opera, and chief conductor of the Swedish Radio Symphony Orchestra. He has previously served as music director of the Houston Symphony Orchestra and chief conductor of the Frankfurt Radio Symphony.

== Early life ==
Born in Medellín, Orozco-Estrada studied music at the Instituto Musical Diego Echavarría and learned to play violin there before taking conducting classes from age 15. Before his seventeenth birthday, he moved to Bogotá to study at the Pontificia Universidad Javeriana. He emigrated to Vienna, Austria, in 1997, where he has lived ever since and where, that same year, he began advanced conducting studies at the University of Music and Performing Arts, where his teachers included Uroš Lajovic.

== Career ==
In June 2004, he first conducted the Tonkünstler Orchestra at a Vienna Festwochen concert, as a last-minute substitute. This led to his appointment as assistant conductor of the orchestra, a post he held for two years. Orozco-Estrada became principal conductor of the Tonkünstler Orchestra in 2009, a post he held until 2015. Earlier he served as principal conductor of the ensemble “recreation” Großes Orchester Graz and, from 2005 to 2007, as music director of Oper Klosterneuburg.

Outside Austria, in May 2007, Orozco-Estrada first guest-conducted the Orquesta Sinfónica de Euskadi in San Sebastián, Spain (his father was of Basque descent). The next year he was named the orchestra's principal conductor, a post he took up in 2009 and held until June 2013.

Antonín Dvořák: Symphony no. 9, first movement, excerpt from a 2016 recording with the Frankfurt Radio Symphony

Orozco-Estrada guest-conducted the Frankfurt Radio Symphony in 2009. In March 2013, he was named the next principal conductor of the hr-Sinfonieorchester, effective with the 2014–2015 season, with an initial contract of 4 years. In April 2016, the orchestra announced the extension of his contract through the 2020–2021 season. He concluded his tenure with the hr-Sinfonieorchester at the close of the 2020–2021 season.

Orozco-Estrada first guest-conducted the London Philharmonic Orchestra (LPO) in November 2013, on a tour with the orchestra in Germany. In January 2014, the LPO announced the appointment of Orozco-Estrada as its next principal guest conductor, effective September 2015.

In 2006, Orozco-Estrada first guest-conducted the Vienna Symphony Orchestra, and also the Swedish Radio Symphony Orchestra. In March 2018, the Vienna Symphony announced his appointment as its next chief conductor, effective with the 2021–2022 season, with an initial contract of 5 years. He held the title of chief conductor-designate in the 2020–2021 season. Orozco-Estrada resigned as chief conductor of the Vienna Symphony on 12 April 2022, with immediate effect. The orchestra said the reason was its decision not to extend his contract beyond 2025.

Orozco-Estrada debuted with the Houston Symphony Orchestra in October 2012, an appearance that led to a second engagement with the orchestra, for a private rehearsal. In January 2013, the Houston Symphony appointed Orozco-Estrada as its next music director, as of the 2014–2015 season. Before taking up the Houston post, he and the orchestra recorded Dvořák's Seventh Symphony. His final contract extension with the Houston Symphony was until the 2021–2022 season. Orozco-Estrada concluded his Houston tenure at the close of the 2021–2022 season.

Orozco-Estrada also serves as principal conductor of the Filarmónica Joven de Colombia and led them on their 2019 European tour. In March 2023, the city of Cologne announced the appointment of Orozco-Estrada as the next Generalmusikdirektor (GMD) of the city, which encompasses the Gürzenich Orchestra Cologne and Cologne Opera general director, effective with the 2025–2026 season.

Orozco-Estrada first guest-conducted the RAI National Symphony Orchestra in May 2022. On the basis of this appearance, the RAI National Symphony Orchestra announced the appointment of Orozco-Estrada as its next principal conductor, effective October 2023, with an initial contract of three seasons. Orozco-Estrada is scheduled to stand down from the RAI National Symphony Orchestra at the close of the 2025–2026 season. In October 2025, the Swedish Radio Symphony Orchestra announced the appointment of Orozco-Estrada as its next chief conductor, effective with the 2026–2027 season.

== Recordings ==
Orozco-Estrada has recorded commercially with the Houston Symphony and the Frankfurt Radio Symphony for Pentatone. He has also recorded with the Tonkünstler-Orchester for Preiser Records, with the Frankfurt Radio Symphony for RCA Red Seal/SME, and on video with the Wiener Symphoniker for Unitel Edition.

- Mahler – Symphony No. 1. Tonkünstler-Orchester. Preiser Records 90784 (2010).
- Mendelssohn – Symphony No. 2, Lobgesang. Tonkünstler-Orchester, Chorus sine nomine, Christiane Oelze, Simona Šaturová, Ian Bostridge. Preiser Records 90796 (2011).
- Zeitpunkte: music by Christian Muthspiel, Thomas Daniel Schlee and Iván Erőd. Tonkünstler-Orchester, Benjamin Schmid, Emiko Uchiyama, Chorus sine nomine, Sharon Kam. Preiser Records PR 90810 (2012).
- Stravinsky – The Rite of Spring & The Firebird (Suite 1919). Frankfurt Radio Symphony. PTC 5186556 (2016).
- Dvořák – Symphony No. 6 & 2, Slavonic Dances. Houston Symphony. PTC 5186575 (2016).
- Dvořák – Symphony No. 7 & 8. Houston Symphony. PTC 5186578 (2016).
- Richard Strauss – Ein Heldenleben / Macbeth. Frankfurt Radio Symphony. PTC 5186582 (2016).
- Dvořák – Symphony No. 9 ("New World") / Slavonic Dances. Houston Symphony. PTC 5186574 (2017).
- Richard Strauss – Salome. Frankfurt Radio Symphony. PTC 5186602 (2017).
- Richard Strauss – Eine Alpensinfonie. Frankfurt Radio Symphony. PTC 5186628 (2018).
- Haydn – Die Schöpfung. Houston Symphony, Houston Symphony Chorus. PTC 5186614 (2018).
- Music of the Americas: Bernstein, Gershwin, Piazzolla, Revueltas. Houston Symphony. PTC 5186619 (2018).
- Wagner – Overtures and Preludes. Frankfurt Radio Symphony. RCA/SME G0100040952382 (2019).
- Jimmy López Bellido – Aurora and Symphony No. 2, Ad Astra. Leticia Moreno, Houston Symphony. PTC 5186962 (2022).
- Catalani – La Wally. Wiener Symphoniker, Arnold Schoenberg Choir. Unitel Edition 806308 (DVD) / 806404 (Blu-ray) (2022).

== Personal life ==
Orozco-Estrada and his wife Julia, an Austrian veterinarian, live in Vienna with their daughter Laura.

Cultural offices
Preceded by Stefan Vladar	Chief Conductor, Großes Orchester Graz; 2005–2009	Succeeded by Michael Hofstetter
Preceded by Gilbert Varga	Principal Conductor, Euskadiko Orchestra; 2009–2013	Succeeded by Jun Märkl
Preceded by James Conlon	Principal Conductor, RAI National Symphony Orchestra; 2023–present	Succeeded by incumbent
Preceded by François-Xavier Roth	Chief Conductor and Gürzenich-Kapellmeister, Gürzenich Orchestra Cologne; 2025–present	Succeeded by incumbent
Preceded by Daniel Harding	Chief Conductor, Swedish Radio Symphony Orchestra; 2026–present	Succeeded by incumbent
