= Isabelle Yalkovsky Byman =

American pianist (1906–1981)

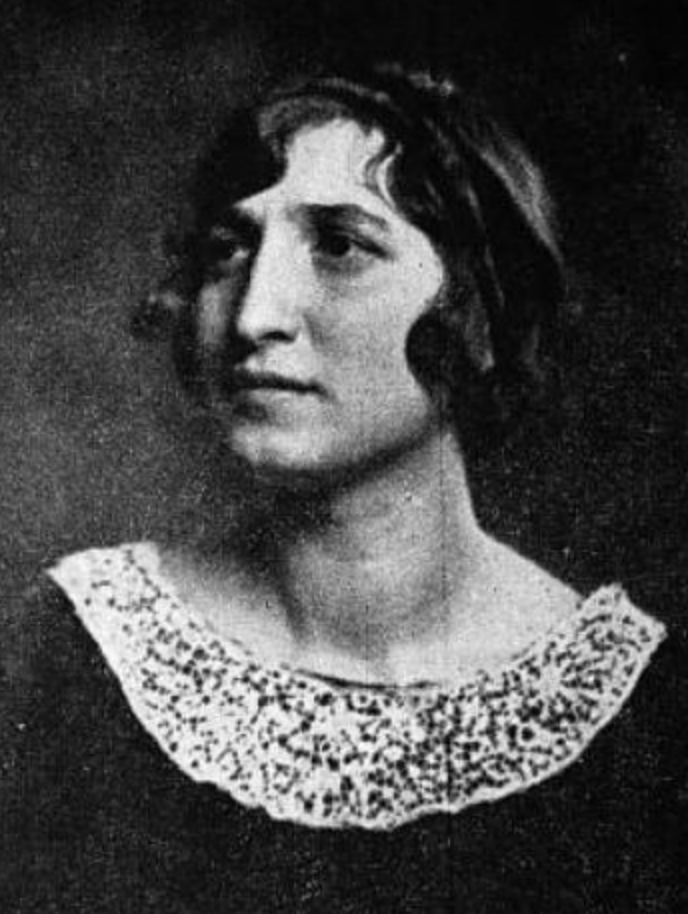
- Isabelle Yalkovsky from a 1929 publication, photographed by Arnold Genthe
- Born: December 24, 1906; Philadelphia, Pennsylvania, US
- Died: December 27, 1981 (aged 75); Bakersfield, California, US
- Occupation: Pianist

Isabelle Yalkovsky Byman (December 24, 1906 – December 27, 1981) was an American pianist and music educator. After a career as a concert pianist, Byman taught at Juilliard, and was head of piano pedagogy at the Manhattan School of Music.

== Early life ==
Yalkovsky was born in Philadelphia, Pennsylvania, the daughter of Shlomo (Samuel) Yalkovsky and Liba (Elizabeth) Lamb Yalkovsky. Her parents were Jewish immigrants from Belarus. She was considered a child musical prodigy in Chicago. She studied with Esther Harris-Dua at the Chicago College of Music and with Olga Samaroff Stokowski at Juilliard. She won the Schubert Memorial Prize in 1929.

== Career ==
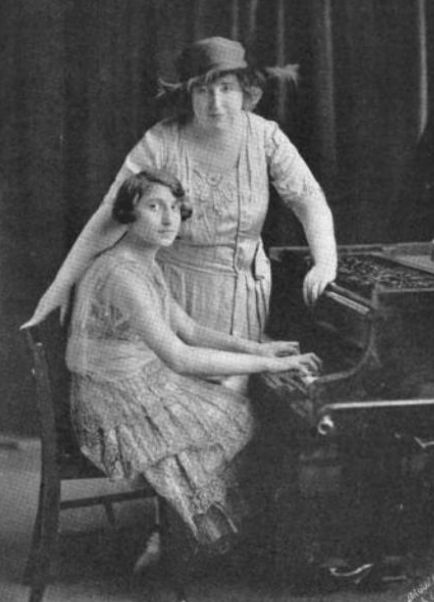
Isabelle Yalkovsky (seated) wth Esther Harris Dua (standing), from a 1922 publication

Yalkovsky first appeared with the Chicago Symphony Orchestra when she was 13 years old. She also played with the New York Philharmonic at Carnegie Hall, with the Philadelphia Orchestra under Leopold Stokowski, and toured the United States and Canada as a concert pianist. She made her first recordings in 1929. "Throughout the playing of Miss Yalkovsky," commented a reviewer in Ohio in 1933, "one is impressed with her sound and adequate technique, the flair for piquant rhythms, and her keen sensitivity for the inner meanings of her music."

She taught at Juilliard, and performed and lectured regularly in Woodstock, New York in the 1950s and 1960s. She served as music editor of the Police and Firemen National Press. From 1971 to 1981, she was head of piano pedagogy at the Manhattan School of Music.

She was author of The Piano Teachers Art: Guidelines for Successful Teaching (1980). She also made an educational film, The Language of Music.

== Personal life ==
Isabelle Yalkovsky married Barnett Byman, who was an executive of the National Orchestral Association. They had a daughter, Luba, and lived in New York City. Isabelle Yalkovsky Byman died in 1981, from a heart attack while visiting Bakersfield, California.
