= Ernst Hoffmann (conductor) =

American conductor

Ernst Heinrich Hoffmann (June 18, 1899 – January 3, 1956) was an American conductor who served as the music director of the Houston Symphony for eleven years. Hoffmann was born in Boston, Massachusetts. His father was a violinist in the Boston Symphony Orchestra. Although Ernst was an accomplished musician in his youth, during which he studied piano with the noted Harold Bauer, he enrolled in the anthropology program at Harvard University. Hoffmann was graduated cum laude in that discipline, whereupon he was offered a position on the Harvard anthropology faculty. He chose instead to go to Germany in 1920 to study music at the conservatory in Berlin. During this time he met Annemarie Clara ("Mini") Hoffmann (her maiden name), a native German teacher of mathematics and languages, whom he married in 1922, and with whom he had one child, a son, Clifford (born in 1927).

Following his Berlin studies, Hoffmann performed as a violinist in Berlin theatre orchestras, often under the baton of the eminent Richard Strauss. In 1924 he was appointed conductor-in-chief of the Breslau Opera and Philharmonic, a position he held for ten years until, under the advent of Hitler's regime, he was declared unacceptable for the position because of his American citizenship.

Hoffmann returned to the United States in 1934. In Boston, he founded the Commonwealth Symphony Orchestra and became its music director. There he came to the attention of leaders of the Houston Symphony, and he was engaged as that orchestra's music director in 1936. Hoffmann was a popular figure in Houston, and his tenure on the podium there was the longest of any music director to that point.

In 1947 Hoffmann left Houston and soon afterward accepted a position as director of orchestral music at Indiana University, a position he held until his death.

En route to Indiana following a Christmas 1955 visit to their son in Houston, Ernst and Annemarie Hoffmann died in an automobile accident near Clarksdale, Mississippi, on January 3, 1956.
