= Juraj Valčuha =

Slovak conductor (born 1976)

- Born: 1976; Bratislava, Slovakia, Czechoslovakia
- Education: Konzervatórium v Bratislave; Conservatoire de Paris
- Occupation: Conductor
- Organizations: RAI National Symphony Orchestra; Teatro di San Carlo; Houston Symphony
- Website: jurajvalcuha.com

Juraj Valčuha (born 1976, Bratislava) is a Slovak conductor who has worked mainly in Italy and France. He is the music director of the Houston Symphony.

== Life ==
Born in Bratislava, Valčuha studied composition, conducting and cimbalom at the Konzervatórium v Bratislave. He later studied conducting with Ilya Musin in Saint Petersburg, Russia, and with Janos Fürst at the Conservatoire de Paris. From 2003 to 2005, he was an assistant conductor at the Orchestre national de Montpellier and the Opéra national de Montpellier.

Valčuha first guest-conducted the RAI National Symphony Orchestra in 2005. He became the orchestra's principal conductor in the 2009–10 season. He concluded his RAI tenure in 2016. In July 2016, the Teatro di San Carlo announced the appointment of Valčuha as its music director, a post he held through 31 December 2022. Valčuha is principal guest conductor of the Konzerthausorchester Berlin as of the 2017–18 season, following his initial guest-conducting appearance with the orchestra in the 2014–15 season, and his subsequent return guest-conducting engagement two years later.

In the US, Valčuha first guest-conducted the Houston Symphony in 2011. He returned as a guest conductor with the Houston Symphony for two subsequent engagements, in April 2018 and in March 2021. In July 2021, the Houston Symphony announced the appointment of Valčuha as its next music director, effective with the 2022–2023 season. In September 2025, the Houston Symphony announced an extension of Valčuha's contract as its music director through the 2027–2028 season.

Valčuha makes his home in France and in Houston.

Cultural offices
Preceded by Rafael Frühbeck de Burgos	Principal Conductor, RAI National Symphony Orchestra; 2009–2016	Succeeded by James Conlon
Preceded by Nicola Luisotti	Music Director, Teatro di San Carlo; 2016–present	Succeeded by incumbent
