= Richard Farrell =

New Zealand musician (1927–1958)

Richard Farrell (30 December 1926 – 27 May 1958) was a New Zealand classical pianist.

== Musical career ==
=== Early life ===
Thomas Richard Farrell was born in Auckland in 1926 to Thomas and Ella Farrell, and spent most of his young years in Wellington. His parents were not musicians, but his uncle, John Farrell, was an actor and singer with J. C. Williamson Theatres Ltd. He attended St Mary's Convent School and St. Patrick's College, both in Wellington.

He made his first radio broadcast when aged only four. From age six he had piano lessons with Florence Fitzgerald, and from age 9 he studied with Gordon Short. At age seven Farrell played his own composition, a lament on the death of Archbishop Francis Redwood, in a public concert with the Wellington Symphony Orchestra. At the age of 12, he was noted to possess absolute pitch.

At the age of 12 he moved to Sydney, Australia with his mother Ella and two brothers, Peter and Paul, going on to study under Alexander Sverjensky at the New South Wales Conservatorium of Music for five years. During this time, he attracted the notice and commendations from Arthur Rubinstein and Eileen Joyce. While the tenor Richard Tauber was on an Australian tour, he heard Farrell and offered him a European tour, which Farrell was unable to accept due to the war that was then in progress.

Farrell returned to New Zealand in 1939 and 1942, giving recitals and performances, but spent most of his time in Australia, where he received much support from the Australian Broadcasting Commission. In 1944 he won the NSW state final of the inaugural competition that later evolved into the ABC Symphony Australia Young Performers Awards.

=== Studies and performances in America ===
In 1945 Eugene Ormandy invited him to come to the US when he was ready. Ormandy told the American pianist William Kapell about him, and Kapell befriended him on his 1947 visit to Australia, and later asked him to be best man at his wedding. On Kapell's personal recommendation he was granted a full scholarship to study with Olga Samaroff at the Juilliard School in New York. He remained with Samaroff for the remaining two years of her life, and she was said to have pronounced that Richard Farrell was the best student she had ever had. He also studied conducting at Juilliard with Serge Koussevitzky.

At Juilliard, he was noticed by Aaron Copland and studied his 1941 Piano Sonata, which became a feature of his repertoire. Copland was heard to commend Farrell for performing the sonata without the aid of a musical score, saying, "Although I composed it myself, I can't memorise it". Farrell then toured in the United States, giving over 60 recitals a year. After another tour of New Zealand, he had his Carnegie Hall debut in 1948, and again received very glowing critiques. Arthur Rubinstein declared that there were "only three pianists in the world" - himself, William Kapell and Richard Farrell. He first appeared with the New York Philharmonic on 2 December 1950, playing Edvard Grieg's Piano Concerto in A minor with Dimitri Mitropoulos conducting.

=== International tours ===
Farrell moved to London in 1951 and his renown grew steadily. Princess Marie Louise, a granddaughter of Queen Victoria, took him under her wing as her protégé. He was one of the first pianists to play in the newly built Royal Festival Hall, and also appeared at the Royal Albert Hall with the Royal Philharmonic Orchestra, the London Philharmonic Orchestra, the Philharmonia Orchestra, the Hallé Orchestra and other orchestras. Among the conductors with whom he worked were Sir Thomas Beecham, Sir Malcolm Sargent, Sir Adrian Boult, Sir John Barbirolli, George Weldon and Walter Susskind, who all professed admiration for him. He also frequently collaborated with his compatriots, the conductors James Robertson and Warwick Braithwaite, who said, "At times during performances his artistic temperament would take charge and quite suddenly the whole concerto would be suffused with a glow of intense musical depth and understanding". These collaborations with Braithwaite concluded with a brilliant performance of Franz Liszt's First Piano Concerto in front of Queen Elizabeth during her first Royal Tour of New Zealand in 1954. He was to tour New Zealand four times between 1948 and 1956. His tours also included India.

His solo and concerto repertoire included Brahms Sonata No. 3, Ballades, Waltzes, Op. 39, and the Variations and Fugue on a Theme by Handel; Ravel's Concerto for the Left Hand and Gaspard de la nuit; Chopin's B minor Sonata and Études, Op. 10; Schumann's Fantasie in C; Beethoven's concertos No. 4 in G major and No. 5 in E flat, "Emperor", and the "Appassionata" and E-flat major, Op. 7 sonatas; Prokofiev's 7th Sonata; Tchaikovsky's Concerto No. 1 in B flat minor; Rachmaninoff's Piano Concerto No. 3 in D minor (which he played under Sir Thomas Beecham), Variations on a Theme of Corelli, Op. 42, and Preludes; Liszt's Piano Concerto No. 1 and transcriptions and paraphrases; Grieg's Concerto in A minor, Ballade in G minor and Lyric Pieces; Hindemith's Sonata No. 2; Copland's Sonata; and pieces by Mendelssohn, Granados and Debussy.

His musical interests, however, were not confined to the piano in solo recitals or in concertos. He performed all of the Beethoven violin sonatas in the Wigmore Hall. He formed the Richard Farrell Piano Quartet with the violinist Brenton Langbein, the violist Eduard Melkus and the cellist Ottomar Borwitzky. They gave three seasons of chamber music concerts throughout Europe, playing music by Brahms, Schubert and Schumann to high praise from the critics. He also often performed with the London String Quartet and with solo artists such as the cellists Pablo Casals and Paul Grümmer and Bernhard Braunholz. He moved to Zürich, Switzerland, in preparation for a career as a conductor, which was his greatest ambition.

William Alwyn composed his Fantasy Waltzes in 1956 for Richard Farrell, who played a number of the individual waltzes on a New Zealand tour, and gave their first complete performance at Broadcasting House, London, on 2 June 1957. Alwyn also dedicated the fifth of his 12 Preludes (1958) to Farrell's memory; it was written shortly after his death.

=== Death ===
Richard Farrell died in a car accident near Arundel, Houghton, Sussex, on 27 May 1958. The car in which he was travelling left the road and hit a tree, killing all three occupants. He was buried in London.

== Critical reception ==
Farrell received many plaudits from musicians and critics. Renowned critic Neville Cardus spoke highly of Farrell after first hearing him in Sydney during the 1940s, noting that "the possibilities or potentialities of Mr Farrell should carry him beyond routine standards" and, in 1951, that he could "well imagine the delight of young Brahms could he have heard Farrell playing".

== Legacy ==
New Zealand's most prestigious piano competition, the Kerikeri National (now International) Piano Competition, for a time offered a "Richard Farrell Award". In 2008 Radio New Zealand presented four one-hour programs on Farrell's life and work, with interviews from many people who had known and worked with him.

Farrell left a number of vinyl recordings, on the Pye label, all in mono. Some of these discs were shared with Iso Elison. His complete studio discography has been transferred to CD, and first volume of his complete recordings (2 CDs) was released by Atoll Records in 2008, and the second volume in 2009.

Richard Farrell Avenue in Remuera, Auckland commemorates him.

== Sources ==
- Jillett, David, Farrell: a biography, Benton-Ross, Auckland, 1985, ISBN 0-908636-14-8
- Grayland, Eugene, More Famous New Zealanders, Christchurch: Whitcombe and Tombs Ltd, 1972, ISBN 0-7233-0335-5
- Richard Farrell
