= Wayne Crouse =

Wayne Crouse (16 December 1924 - 19 May 2000) was the viola professor emeritus at the University of Oklahoma from 1982 and principal violist of the Oklahoma City Philharmonic from 1989 until his death from cancer at the age of 75.

During the war he served in the U.S. Air Force. Crouse graduated from the Juilliard School in 1951, where he studied with Milton Katims, Ivan Galamian, and Dorothy DeLay. In his debut Juilliard concert, he played the violin, but he was encouraged to switch to the viola. He served as the principal violist of the Houston Symphony for 28 of his 32 years there, during which he performed the Walton Viola Concerto under the direction of Sir William Walton three times in January 1969. Crouse was also violist in the Lyric Art Quartet at the University of Houston, the Virtuoso Quartet, and the Shepherd Quartet at Rice University, where he taught for some time.

Later in his life, he taught at University of Oklahoma and was the principal violist of the Oklahoma City Philharmonic.

The new Wayne Crouse Quartet, a student performance group that was formed in his honor, was in residence at the University of Houston beginning in Fall 2000.
