= James Conlon =

American conductor

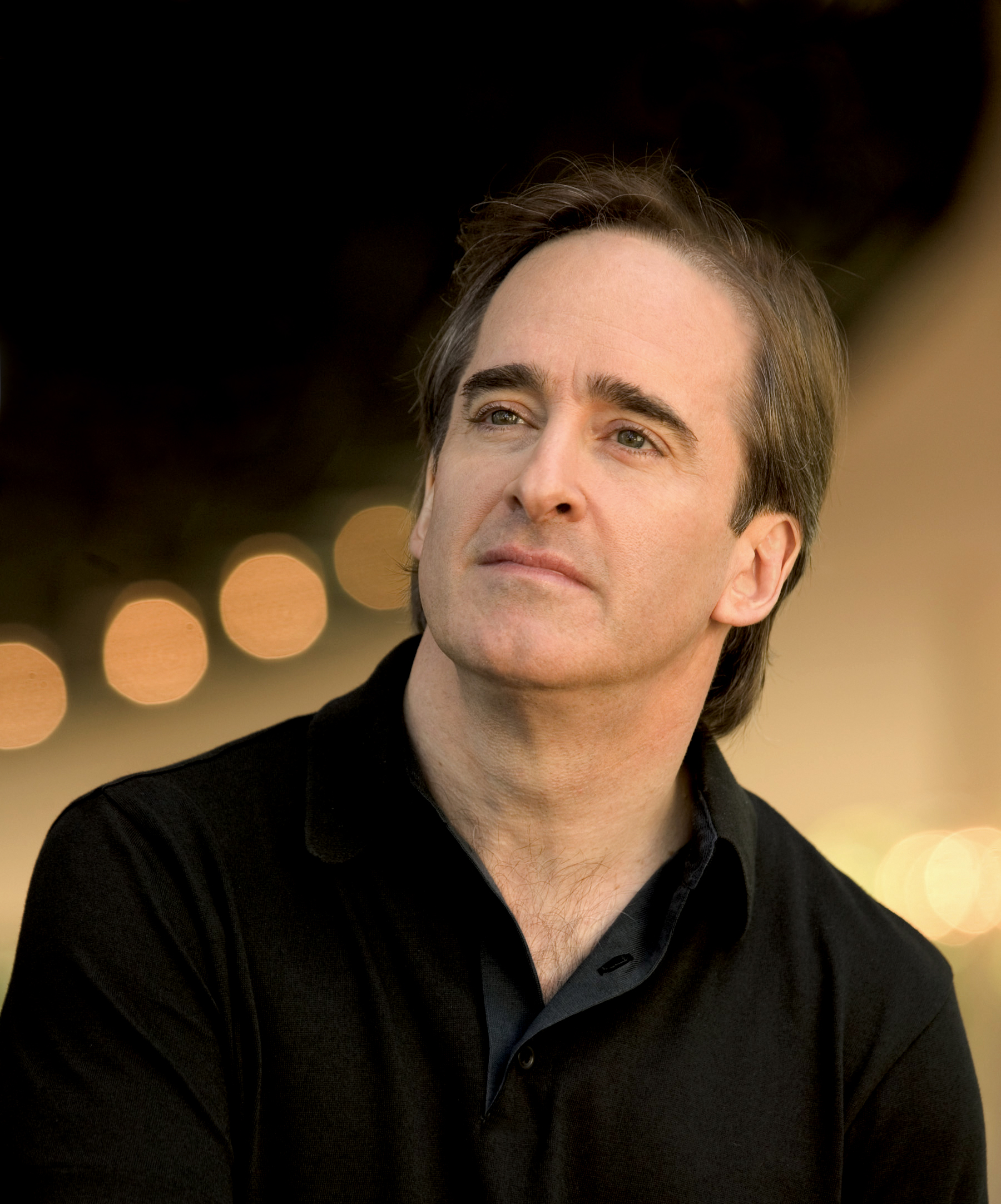
- Conlon in 2004
- Born: March 18, 1950 (age 76); New York City, United States
- Occupation: Conductor

James Conlon (born March 18, 1950) is an American conductor. He is the conductor laureate of Los Angeles Opera, having served as its music director from 2006 to 2026. He also served as principal conductor of the RAI National Symphony Orchestra from 2016 to 2020.

== Early years ==
Conlon grew up in a family of five children on Cherry Street in Douglaston, Queens, New York City. His mother, Angeline L. Conlon, was a freelance writer. His father was an assistant to the New York City Commissioner of Labor in the Robert F. Wagner administration. His siblings were not musically inclined, nor were his parents. When he was eleven, he went to a production of La traviata by the North Shore Opera. He asked for music lessons and became a treble (boy soprano) in a children's chorus in an opera company in Queens. He dreamed about being a tenor, then a baritone, and even wanted to sing the role of Carmen at one point. Finally it dawned on him that the only way to do everything in opera was to become an operatic conductor.

== Education ==
Conlon entered the High School of Music & Art at the age of fifteen and at eighteen he was accepted into the Aspen Music Festival and School conducting program, and in September 1968 he entered the Juilliard School of music. In 1970, the Juilliard Orchestra took an educational tour to Europe and he was invited to Spoleto the next year as an assistant doing work as a répétiteur, coach and chorus conductor. During that time, he conducted one performance of Boris Godunov. He recalled that he had fallen in love with this opera at a young age, and had dreamed that it would be the first opera he would conduct.

In 1972, at a scheduled Juilliard production of La bohème directed by Michael Cacoyannis, conductor Thomas Schippers suddenly withdrew. At the time, Maria Callas was doing a series of master classes at Juilliard and heard Conlon in rehearsal. She suggested to Juilliard's president, Peter Mennin, that Conlon should step in to conduct.

== Career ==
Conlon received the conducting award of the American National Orchestral Association, and in 1974 became the youngest conductor engaged for the New York Philharmonic Orchestra's subscription series. In 1976 he made his Metropolitan Opera debut and his British debut with the Scottish Opera, and in 1979 he debuted at Covent Garden. He was named director of the Cincinnati May Festival in 1979, a position he retained until 2016. After engagements with the Paris Opéra, Maggio Musicale in Florence, Rotterdam Philharmonic Orchestra and the Chicago Lyric Opera, Conlon became chief conductor of the Cologne Opera in 1989. In 1996, he was appointed music director of the Opéra National de Paris.

Since his New York Philharmonic debut in 1974 at the invitation of Pierre Boulez, Conlon has appeared with virtually every major North American and European orchestra. He has also appeared with many of the world's major opera companies, including Teatro alla Scala (Milan), the Royal Opera at Covent Garden (London), the Lyric Opera of Chicago, and the Maggio Musicale Fiorentino (Florence). Associated for almost 30 years with the Metropolitan Opera, where he made his debut in 1976, he has conducted more than 250 performances there, leading a wide range of works from the Italian, German, French, Russian and Czech repertoires.

Conlon has held several major European posts, including principal conductor of the Rotterdam Philharmonic (1983–1991), Generalmusikdirektor (GMD) of the City of Cologne, Germany (1989–2002), where he was simultaneously GMD of the Gürzenich Orchestra and the Cologne Opera, and principal conductor of the Paris National Opera (1995–2004), where his Paris tenure was the longest of any conductor there since 1939. In 2015, he was named principal conductor of the RAI National Symphony Orchestra.

== Career in the US ==
Conlon has been music director of the Los Angeles Opera since the 2006–2007 season. His work there has included a series called "Recovered Voices", a multi-year project during which Conlon presented operas by composers affected by the Third Reich. The series included a double-bill of Alexander von Zemlinsky's Der Zwerg and Viktor Ullmann's Der zerbrochene Krug, and operas by composers such as Schreker and Braunfels. Conlon has conducted seven of Wagner's operas with Los Angeles Opera, including the first-ever Los Angeles performances Der Ring des Nibelungen in 2008–2009. In September 2021, the company announced the newest extension of Conlon's contract as music director, through the 2024–2025 season. In March 2024, Los Angeles Opera announced that Conlon is to conclude his tenure as its music director at the close of the 2025-2026 season, and subsequently to take the title of conductor laureate.

Conlon's tenure as music director of the Cincinnati May Festival, from 1979 to 2016, was the longest such tenure in the festival's history. He served as music director of the Ravinia Festival from 2005 to 2015. In November 2020, the Baltimore Symphony Orchestra announced the appointment of Conlon as its artistic advisor, effective with the 2021–2022 season, for a period of three seasons, an unusual appointment in that Conlon had not conducted the orchestra prior to the announcement. Conlon conducted his first concert with the Baltimore Symphony Orchestra in October 2021.

== Composers from the Holocaust era ==
In an effort to raise public consciousness to the significance of works of composers whose lives and compositions were affected by the Holocaust, Conlon has devoted himself to extensive programming of this music in North America and Europe. This includes the works of such composers as Alexander von Zemlinsky, Viktor Ullmann, Pavel Haas, Kurt Weill, Erich Wolfgang Korngold, Karl Amadeus Hartmann, Erwin Schulhoff, and Ernst Krenek. In addition to "Recovered Voices" at Los Angeles Opera, each summer when he was music director of the Ravinia Festival, Conlon presented a different composer from this group with the Chicago Symphony Orchestra. He has highlighted works of Viktor Ullmann, Erwin Schulhoff, and Alexander von Zemlinsky thus far. A production of Ullman's Der Kaiser von Atlantis, conceived by Conlon, has traveled extensively since its first showing in New York. Produced in cooperation with the Juilliard School, it has since been reprised at the Spoleto Festival in Italy, the Ravinia Festival, in cooperation with the New World Symphony Orchestra, the Houston Grand Opera, with the Chicago Symphony Orchestra at Temple Sholom in Chicago and the Los Angeles Philharmonic, where it was performed in 2004 at the Wilshire Boulevard Temple.

In 2021, Conlon delivered a TED (conference) Talk: "Resurrecting Forbidden Music."

== Recordings ==
Conlon has recorded extensively for the EMI, Erato, Capriccio and Sony Classical labels. He made his first recording for Telarc of the world premiere of Franz Liszt's St. Stanislaus oratorio, released in January 2004. A champion of the works of Alexander Zemlinsky, he has made nine recordings of the composer's operas and orchestral works with the Gürzenich Orchestra-Cologne Philharmonic for EMI. Several of these recordings individually have earned prestigious international awards, and in October 2002, the series was awarded the 2002 ECHO Classic Award for "Editorial Achievement of the Year." Conlon has also inaugurated a new series of 20th century works with Capriccio, including a CD of works by Erwin Schulhoff with the Bayerischer Rundfunk, and a CD/DVD of the works of Viktor Ullmann with the Gürzenich Orchestra, which won the Preis der deutschen Schallplattenkritik (German Record Critics Award for Excellence). His other Capriccio recordings include the works of Karl Amadeus Hartmann and Dmitri Shostakovich with violinist Vladimir Spivakov and the Cologne Philharmonic. His most recent recording is a CD of works by Bohuslav Martinů with the Bavarian Radio Symphony Orchestra on Capriccio.

== Television ==
PBS aired a series of six shows hosted by Conlon entitled Encore during the spring of 2006, part of an ongoing series of documentaries on his work with the finalists of the Van Cliburn International Piano Competition, which have also included "Playing on the Edge" and "Hearing Ear to Ear with James Conlon". Among his other recent television appearances on PBS are, Concerto, six half-hour shows hosted by Conlon, and Cincinnati May Festival 2000.

== Film ==
Conlon has conducted the orchestra for Kenneth Branagh's The Magic Flute (2006), a film version in English of Mozart's opera, reset during World War I, but otherwise very faithful to the original plot. The film has been released in Europe, but, as of April 2010, not in the United States, nor has it been shown on American television.

Conlon adapted, arranged, and conducted the score for the 1995 film production of Madame Butterfly.

== Selected awards ==
- Grand Prix du Disque (France), for EMI recording of Zemlinsky: The Dwarf, 1997
- In 1999, Conlon received the University of Cincinnati College-Conservatory of Music Zemlinsky Prize, awarded only once before, for his efforts in bringing the composer's music to international attention.
- He was awarded an Honorary Doctor of Music degree by the Juilliard School in 2004, an honorary Doctor of Arts honoris causa by Chapman University in 2009 and an honorary Doctor of Humane Letters from Brandeis University in 2009.
- In 2005, Conlon received one of five annual Opera News Awards given for the first time in recognition of distinguished contributions from leading figures in the world of opera.
- He has been honored by The New York Public Library as a "Library Lion", an annual award given to individuals in recognition of their contributions through their work.
- Conlon was named an Officier de L'Ordre des Arts et des Lettres by the French Government in 1996, and in September 2004 he was promoted to Commander—the highest honor awarded by the Ministry of Culture in France. In September 2002, Conlon received France's highest distinction from the President of the French Republic, Jacques Chirac—the Légion d'Honneur.
- Conlon was honored by the Anti-Defamation League for his work championing composers silenced by the Third Reich. Conlon received the League's Crystal Globe Award at the Ravinia Festival in Highland Park near Chicago on August 12, 2007.
- Conlon received the Medal of the American Liszt Society in recognition of his distinctive performances of the composer's works.
- He received Italy's Premio Galileo 2000 Award for his significant contribution to music, art and peace in Florence in 2008.
- Conlon received the Music Institute of Chicago's Dushkin Award in recognition of his artistry and passion as a performer, educator, and mentor in 2009.
- Conlon's rendition of Kurt Weill's Rise and Fall of the City of Mahagonny won a 2009 Grammy Award for Best Opera Recording. The recording was made with Los Angeles Opera.
- Conlon was inducted in 2009 into the American Classical Music Hall of Fame.
- Lifetime Achievement Award from the Istituto Italiano di Cultura in Los Angeles for his lifelong activity and dedication to music and excellence in conducting in Italy, as well as all over the world in 2011.
- Commendatore dell'Ordine Al merito della Repubblica Italiana (Order of Merit of the Italian Republic) conferred by Sergio Mattarella, Il Presidente della Repubblica 30 Dicembre 2016.
- Conlon's world premiere recording of John Corigliano's The Ghosts of Versailles with Los Angeles Opera won the 2017 Grammy Award for Best Opera Recording and Grammy Award for Best Engineered Album, Classical.
- Conlon has been awarded Austria's Cross of Honor for Science and Art (Österreichische Ehrenkreuz für Wissenschaft und Kunst) in 2023.

== Personal life ==
Conlon married Jennifer Ringo, a soprano and vocal coach, on January 9, 1987, at St. Patrick's Cathedral in New York. She is a graduate of the Juilliard School of Music and the University of Iowa. They have two daughters, Luisa, who was named for the Verdi opera Luisa Miller, and Emma. Luisa acted in the 1998 Merchant Ivory film, A Soldier's Daughter Never Cries. She is a documentary filmmaker, journalist, producer and DP. Emma is an interdisciplinary performer, under EYC, and humanitarian activist.

== Selected discography ==
- Berlioz: Béatrice et Bénédict, Erato Disques.
- John Corigliano - The Ghosts of Versailles. James Conlon, Patricia Racette, Christopher Maltman, Kristinn Sigmundsson, Joshua Guerrero, Los Angeles Opera. PENTATONE PTC 5186538 (2016)
- Liszt: Faust Symphony, Erato Disques.
- Mendelssohn: Elijah, EMI Classics.
- Puccini: La Bohème, Erato/Red Seal, 1998.
- Puccini: Tosca, Virgin Classics DVD, 1978.
- Puccini's Heroines: The Power of Love, Warner, 2002.
- Shostakovich: Violin Concerto no. 1; Lady Macbeth of Mtsensk Suite, Capriccio, 2002.
- Bo Skovhus: Arias, Sony Classical, 1998.
- Stravinsky: Le Rossignol, EMI, 1999.
- Zemlinsky: Eine florentinische Tragödie, EMI Classics, 1997.
- Zemlinsky: The Dwarf, EMI, 1997.
- Zemlinsky: Symphonies Nos. 1 & 2, Angel, 1998.
- Zemlinsky: Cymbeline Suite/Ein Tanzpoem/Frühlingsbegräbnis, EMI, 2001.
- Zemlinsky: Choral and Orchestral Works, EMI, 2002.
- Amore II: Great Italian Love Arias, Sony Classical, 2000.
- A Salute to American Music (Richard Tucker Music Foundation Gala XVI), RCA Victor Red Seal, 1992.

Cultural offices
Preceded by James Levine	Music Director, Cincinnati May Festival; 1979–2016	Succeeded by Juanjo Mena
Preceded by David Zinman	Principal Conductor, Rotterdam Philharmonic Orchestra; 1983–1991	Succeeded by Jeffrey Tate
Preceded by Marek Janowski	Music Director, Gürzenich Orchester, Köln; 1989–2002	Succeeded by Markus Stenz
Preceded by Myung-whun Chung	Principal Conductor, Opéra National de Paris; 1995–2004	Succeeded by Philippe Jordan
Preceded by Christoph Eschenbach	Music Director, Ravinia Festival; 2005–2015	Succeeded by Marin Alsop (chief conductor)
Preceded by Kent Nagano	Music Director, Los Angeles Opera; 2006-present	Succeeded by incumbent
Preceded by Juraj Valčuha	Principal Conductor, RAI National Symphony Orchestra; 2016-2020	Succeeded by Andres Orozco-Estrada
