= Gürzenich Orchestra Cologne =

German symphony orchestra

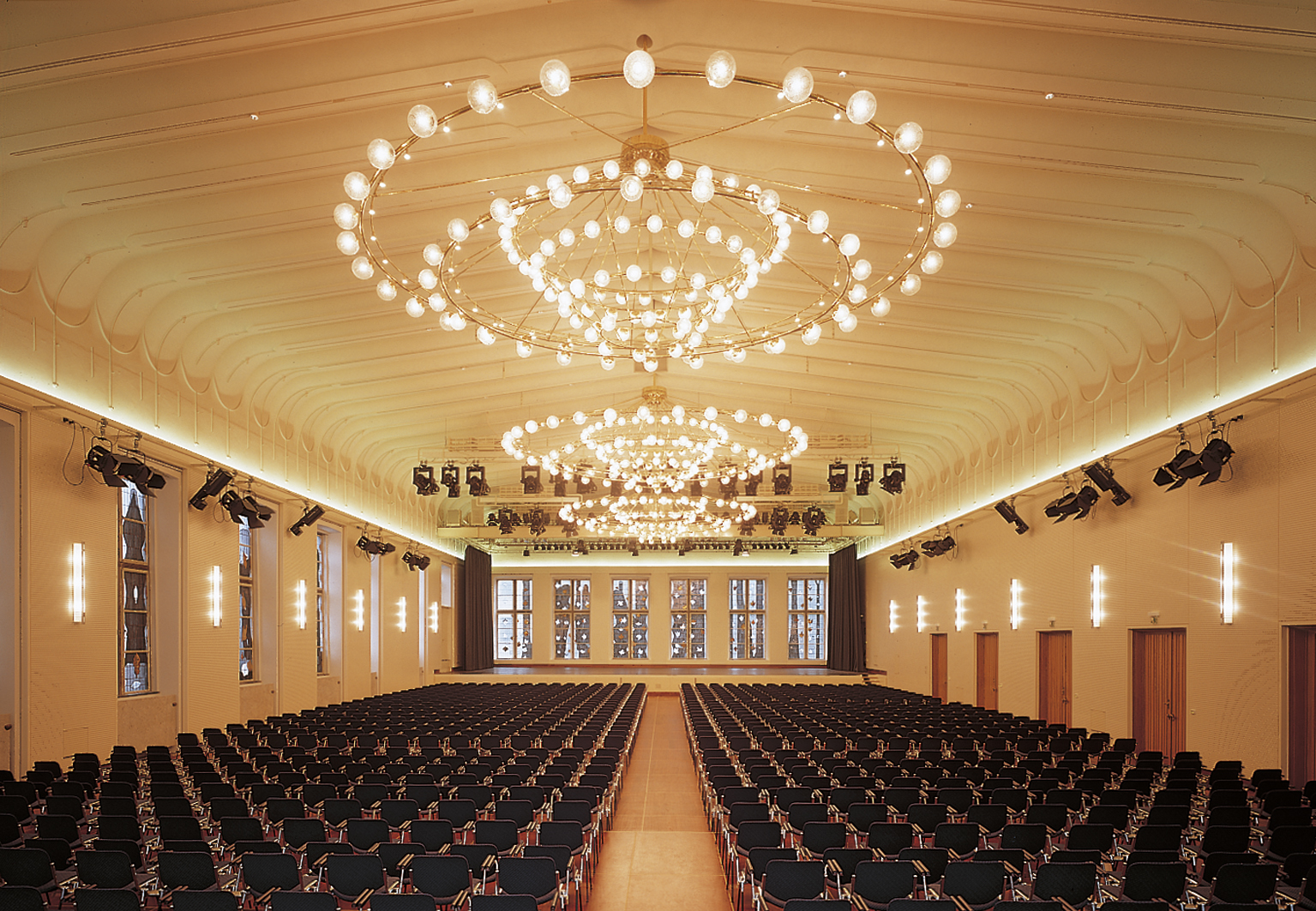
Gürzenich – Grand Hall

The Gürzenich Orchestra Cologne (German: Gürzenich-Orchester Köln) is a German symphony orchestra based in Cologne.

== History ==
The Gürzenich Orchestra traces its origins to 1827, when a group of Cologne Bürger sponsored the creation of the "Cölner Concert-Gesellschaft" (Cologne Concert Society) to set up "Gesellschaftskonzerte" (Society concerts) and "Abonnementskonzerte" (subscription concerts). The orchestra began to give concerts at the Gürzenich concert hall in 1857, from which it derived its current name. In 1986, the orchestra took up residence at the Kölner Philharmonie. The orchestra also plays in opera productions in the Cologne Opera.

The Generalmusikdirektor (GMD) of the city of Cologne, which includes the post of Gürzenich-Kapellmeister, is François-Xavier Roth, since 1 September 2015. Roth's initial contract was for 5 years. In October 2018, the orchestra extended Roth's contract to 2022. In September 2022, the city of Cologne announced that Roth is to stand down as Gürzenich-Kapellmeister at the close of the 2024–2025 season. In July 2024, in light of accusations against Roth of sexting and sexually inappropriate conduct towards other musicians, the city of Cologne announced the close of Roth's tenure as Gürzenich-Kapellmeister and chief conductor of the Cologne Opera with immediate effect, one season earlier than the previously scheduled tenure conclusion.

In March 2023, the city of Köln announced the appointment of Andrés Orozco-Estrada as its next GMD and Gürzenich-Kapellmeister, effective with the 2025–2026 season. Also in March 2023, Sakari Oramo first guest-conducted the orchestra. In October 2024, the orchestra announced the appointment of Oramo to the newly-created position of 'Artistic Partner', effective with the 2025–2026 season, with an initial contract of five seasons.

== Premieres ==
The world premieres performed by the Gürzenich Orchestra include the following works:

- Johannes Brahms, Double Concerto for Violin and Cello (1887)
- Richard Strauss, Till Eulenspiegel's Merry Pranks (1895)
- Richard Strauss, Don Quixote (1898)
- Gustav Mahler, Symphony No. 3 (in collaboration with the Städtische Kapelle Krefeld, 1902)
- Gustav Mahler, Symphony No. 5 (1904)
- Max Reger, Variations and Fugue on a Theme by Hiller (1907)
- Raffaele d'Alessandro: Symphony Nr 1 in d minor op. 62 (1949)
- Bernd Alois Zimmermann, Sinfonia prosodica (1964)

== Gürzenich-Kapellmeister ==
- Conradin Kreutzer (1840–1842)
- Heinrich Dorn (1843–1849)
- Ferdinand Hiller (1850–1884)
- Franz Wüllner (1884–1902)
- Fritz Steinbach (1903–1914)
- Hermann Abendroth, GMD (1915–1934)
- Eugen Papst (1936–1944)
- Günter Wand, GMD (1945–1974)
- Yuri Ahronovitch (1975–1986)
- Marek Janowski (1986–1990)
- James Conlon, GMD (1990–2002)
- Markus Stenz, GMD (2003–2014)
- François-Xavier Roth, GMD (2015–2024)
- Andrés Orozco-Estrada, GMD (2025–present)

== Recordings ==
The orchestra's discography includes several CDs for EMI Classics of the music of Alexander von Zemlinsky, conducted by James Conlon. Under conductor emeritus Dmitri Kitayenko, the orchestra recorded a number of complete cycles by the composers Shostakovich, Prokofiev, and Tchaikovsky.
