= Mark Kellogg (musician) =

- Genres: Jazz, classical
- Instruments: Trombone, alto trombone, euphonium

Mark Kellogg is an American musician who worked as the principal trombonist of the Rochester Philharmonic Orchestra. He is an associate professor of classical and jazz trombone and euphonium at the Eastman School of Music in Rochester, New York.

== Education ==
Kellogg holds a bachelor's degree and performer's certificate from the Eastman School of Music at the University of Rochester, where he studied with John Marcellus and Cherry Beauregard.

== Career ==
Kellogg was a member of the San Francisco Symphony, Syracuse Symphony Orchestra, and National Repertory Orchestra. He is also a co-founder of the jazz group Rhythm & Brass. Kellogg has performed with Clark Terry, Wynton Marsalis, Eddie Daniels, Mel Tormé, Jeff Tyzik, Gene Bertoncini, Allen Vizzutti, Steve Gadd, and others.

== Personal life ==
Kellogg lives in Pittsford, New York. His wife, Joanna Bassett, is a flautist and associate dean of the Hochstein School of Music & Dance.
