= Alfred Teltschik =

American pianist (1919–2009)

Alfred Teltschik (April 21, 1919 – May 19, 2009) was an American duo pianist and teacher. He was born in Floresville, Texas to Frank and Lenora Teltschik.

Alfred attended the Juilliard School of music, where he studied principally with Olga Samaroff. After his debut at Carnegie Hall, he began a duo-piano concert tour with his brother Herbert Teltschik (April 2, 1918 – January 19, 2013), performing more than 1,000 concerts throughout the United States, Canada, and Mexico. The Teltschik Brothers were renowned for their technique, synergy, and musicianship.

After touring for more than 25 years, he settled in Houston, Texas and began the Teltschik Music Studios with his two brothers, Herbert and Frank. In addition to teaching piano, Alfred also composed hundreds of works for solo and duo-piano. He continued to teach piano until only a few years before his death.
