= SNMNMNM =

- Origin: Rochester, New York
- Genres: Indie rock
- Years active: 1997-2007
- Labels: Skunk Ape, International Cork, Unschooled

SNMNMNM is a band that formed in Rochester, New York, US, in 1997. The group's name is a condensation of "Seamus 'n Matt 'n Mark 'n Matt". While completing music degrees at the Eastman School of Music, the band members got together to play outside of their studies in an alternative music band, performing several shows at Java's, a coffee shop directly adjacent to Eastman. Blending traditional brass instruments (like tuba, trombone, and trumpet) with electronics, the band self-released their first album and toured before relocating to Los Angeles in 2002. Media attention built as the band released an EP in 2002 and a full-length in 2003, continuing to tour behind the records. Their album, As Best As We Can reached #65 on the CMJ charts and was covered by The New York Times. All of the songs on As Best As We Can feature exclamation points in their titles. Their newest album, Crawl Inside Your Head was released on September 18, 2007.

== Members ==
- Mark Daumen (amplified tuba/vocals)
- Matthew Kenney (lead guitar/trumpet/vocals)
- Seamus Kenney (lead vocals/guitar/Micron synth/trombone/ accordion)
- Matthew Vooris (drums/vocals)

== Discography ==
- SNMNMNM LP a.k.a. "The Red Album" (Funslide, 1999)
- Asbestos Weekend EP (Skunk Ape, 2002)
- Power Pack Horse Crunch LP (International Cork, 2003)
- As Best As We Can LP (Unschooled, 2005)
- So Have a Cup of Cheer EP (Unschooled Records, 2005)
- Exploderama EP (Unschooled Records, 2006)
- Crawl Inside Your Head (Unschooled Records, 2007)
