= Uriel Nespoli =

Italian conductor

Uriel Nespoli (January 15, 1884 – June 1973) was an Italian conductor born in Naples.

A pupil of Leopoldo Mugnone, Nespoli specialized in Italian opera. He was considered a National Treasure to Italy, and in 1931 he was secretly brought to the United States for safety. He first served as music director of the Houston Symphony, which was reforming after a 13-year break, having dissolved in 1918 owing to World War I, and from general lack of funding. After conducting concerts in the spring of 1931 and for the entirety of the 1931–1932 season, Nespoli was dismissed from his post in Houston. He continued his conducting career in New York City. He was the third conductor to conduct Giacomo Puccini's famed opera La boheme, and reputedly never forgave Puccini for not having given him the premiere, as they had known each other well as colleagues in younger days. However, it is said that he was in Brazil at the time of its first performance.

Among his musical colleagues was the operatic soprano Rosa Ponselle. He directed several future opera singers to her for lessons at her Villa Pace in Baltimore.
