= Mark Scatterday =

American conductor (born 1959)

- Born: Mark Davis Scatterday; August 26, 1959 (age 67); Akron, Ohio

Academic background
- Education: University of Akron (BM); University of Michigan (MM); Eastman School of Music (DMA)

Academic work
- Discipline: Music
- Sub-discipline: Conducting
- Institutions: Cornell University; Eastman School of Music

Mark Davis Scatterday (born 1959) is an American conductor best known for his association with the Eastman School of Music, at which he is currently serving as conductor of the Eastman Wind Ensemble.

== Education ==
Scatterday earned a Doctor of Musical Arts degree in conducting from the Eastman School of Music in 1989 and holds a Master of Music degree in trombone performance from the University of Michigan and Bachelor of Music degrees in music education and trombone performance from The University of Akron. He has studied conducting with Donald Hunsberger, David Effron, Sydney Hodkinson, Carl St.Clair, H. Robert Reynolds, and Richard Jackoboice, and trombone with H. Dennis Smith, Edwin Anderson, Edward Zadronzny, Milt Stevens, David Langlitz, and Hal Janks.

== Early career ==
Prior to his appointment at the Eastman School, Scatterday served as Professor of Music and Chair of the Department of Music at Cornell University in Ithaca, NY from 1989–2002, where he conducted the Cornell Wind Ensemble, Chamber Orchestra, Wind Symphony, Chamber Winds, and Festival Orchestra. He also taught conducting, music theory, and low brass performance. While at Cornell, he was one of the principal conductors of the professional new music group Ensemble X, which made its Carnegie Hall debut in 2003, and was also the conductor and music director of the Cayuga Winds, a professional chamber winds ensemble in Ithaca, New York. He also has taught conducting at Ithaca College.

== Eastman Wind Ensemble ==
On January 28, 2002, after an extensive search, the Eastman School named Scatterday the fourth conductor of the world-renowned Eastman Wind Ensemble, succeeding his former teacher Donald Hunsberger, who had conducted the ensemble for 37 years.

Since 2002, Scatterday has served as the conductor of the Eastman Wind Ensemble and the Eastman Wind Orchestra at the Eastman School of Music of the University of Rochester in Rochester, New York. At Eastman, Scatterday serves as Professor of Conducting. He was also the former Chair of the Conducting and Ensembles Department. In 2004, he led the Eastman Wind Ensemble in their return tour to Japan, as well as to Taiwan and Macau. In 2005, he led the ensemble in a highly acclaimed performance at Carnegie Hall and also conducted in Japan as part of the opening ceremonies of the new concert hall in Karuizawa, joined by members of the Tokyo Philharmonic Orchestra. Recently, he conducted the premiere recording of Roberto Sierra's Cancionero Sefardi with members of the Milwaukee Symphony Orchestra on Fleur De Son Classics, Judith Weir's Concerto for Piano and Musicians Wrestling Everywhere with Ensemble X on Albany Records and Danzante with James Thompson and the Eastman Wind Ensemble on Summit Records, Barcelonazo on Bridge Records (nominated for a 2008 Latin Grammy) and Manhattan Music with the EWE and the Canadian Brass on Opening Day Records (nominated for a 2009 Juno). Recently, he has led the Eastman Wind Ensemble in appearances at major venues such as Severance Hall in Cleveland, and Salzburg, Vienna, Prague, and Bayreuth with the Eastman Harmonie.

== Advocate of contemporary music ==
Scatterday is an advocate of contemporary music, especially the music of composers Karel Husa and Roberto Sierra. He has commissioned Roberto Sierra's Diferencias (1997), Fanfarria (2000) and Octeto (2003) and transcribed his Fandangos (2004) and Sinfonia No. 3 and Alegria (2009). His other commissions and premiers include works by composers such as Steven Stucky, David Maslanka, Jorge Liderman, Verne Reynolds, Christopher Theofanidis, Robert Paterson, John Fitz Rogers, David Liptak, Robert Morris, Jeff Tyzik, Joseph Turrin, Kyle Blaha, Jacob Bancks, James Matheson, Steven Burke, Sally Lamb, Sydney Hodkinson, and David Borden.

Cultural offices
Preceded by Donald Hunsberger	Conductor of the Eastman Wind Ensemble; 2002–present	Incumbent
