= Catherine Rodland =

American organist

Catherine R. Rodland is an organist and church musician best known for her recitals throughout the United States, Canada, and Europe. She also holds a teaching position at St. Olaf College.

Rodland graduated from St. Olaf College in 1987, and received M.M. and D.M.A. degrees from the Eastman School of Music, where she was a student of Russell Saunders. She was a prizewinner in the 1994 and 1998 AGO Young Artists Competitions and the 1994 Calgary International Organ Competition. She was also awarded first prize in the 1989 International Organ Competition at the University of Michigan.

Currently, she is Artist in Residence at St. Olaf College. At St. Olaf, Rodland teaches a full studio of organ students as well as music theory and ear training classes.

== Recordings ==
- Messiaen, Transport du joie from "Ascension", Catherine Rodland, organist
- Messiaen, "Dieu parmi mous" from Nativite, Catherine Rodland, organist
