= Mark Bailey (conductor) =

American musician and conductor

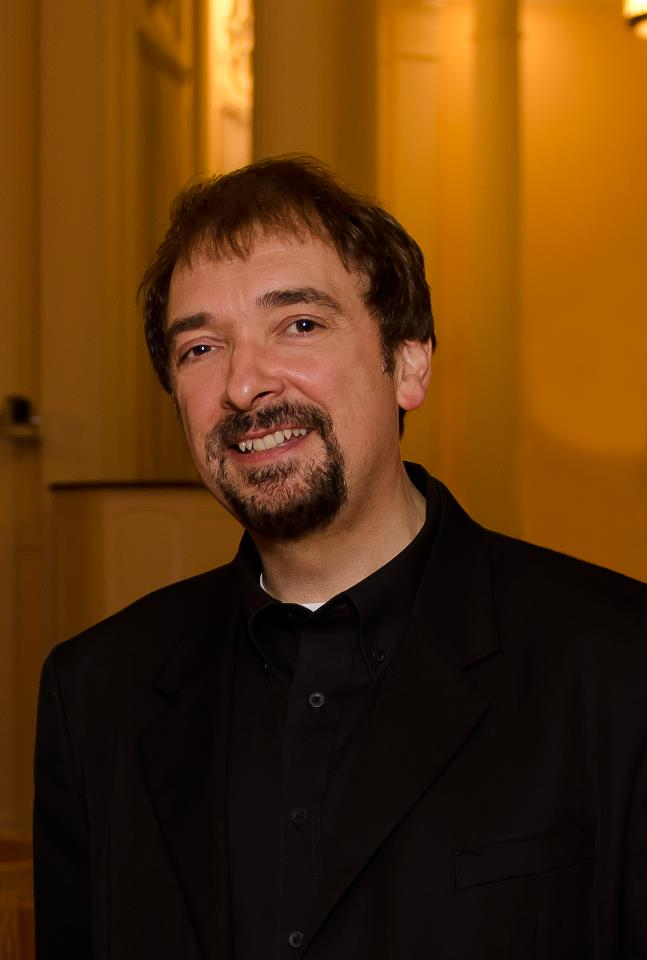
Mark Bailey in 2012

Mark Bailey (born 1962) is an American conductor and baroque violist. He is the founder and artistic director of the American Baroque Orchestra. Bailey specializes in Slavic music of the 17th and 18th centuries, in addition to baroque, classical, and romantic repertoire, and was the former music director of the Yale Russian Chorus. Bailey frequently guest conducts ensembles such as the Edmonton Symphony Orchestra, Cappella Romana, The Portland Baroque Orchestra, and Pro Coro Canada. He has also conducted two gala concerts at Carnegie Hall by invitation.

He often gives presentations on Slavic baroque music and historical performance practice, and has been a principal guest speaker for the Great Performers series, the Mostly Mozart Festival at Lincoln Center in New York City, the 2016 Musicking Conference at the University of Oregon, and the Indiana University International Performance Practice Conference.

Born and raised outside Rochester, New York, Bailey began his musical studies in viola and piano at an early age, and started singing through his involvement in the Eastman Children's Chorus. While concentrating in vocal performance and piano as an undergraduate, he began to study conducting with David Effron. As a graduate student he changed his focus to this field, studying conducting (and Liturgy and Russian) at Yale. Later he continued his conducting studies with Harold Farberman. Upon graduation Bailey worked as an assistant conductor while leaning toward Russian romantic and 20th century repertoire, opera, and Orthodox sacred music. In the 1990s he met baroque violinist Jaap Schröder, and began to study period performance practice.

Mr. Bailey is Founding Artistic Director and of the American Baroque Orchestra (ABO), which performs on period instruments and has recently expanded into Romantic-era performance practice, including its 2025 recording Melodrama. Other ABO releases feature Slavic repertoire from the 17th to early 19th centuries and works by composers of African descent. Under Bailey's leadership, the ensemble has performed early-conceived versions of Handel's Messiah and J.S. Bach's St. John Passion. ABO frequently collaborates with cultural and educational institutions, including the Choirs of Trinity on the Green, New Haven, Carnegie Hall's Link Up program, the Housatonic Museum of Art, the Chatham Historical Society, among others. Other programs have included choral festivals and instrumental workshops focused on period performance.

Mr. Bailey taught conducting and directed the collegiate choir for seven years at the Mahanaim Music School. His guest conducting engagements include the Portland Baroque Orchestra, Edmonton Symphony Orchestra, Cappella Romana, and Pro Coro Canada. Bailey's former conducting positions have included artistic and music director of the New Haven Oratorio Choir and Orchestra, the Westchester Concert Singers, The New England Benefit Orchestra, and The Festival Chamber Orchestra at Yale. He was the assistant conductor of the Eastman Philharmonia, the opera department at the Eastman School of Music, and for the Heidelberg Castle Opera Festival in Heidelberg, Germany.

As a baroque violist, Bailey most recently founded the Musica Vera Duo in 2015, with guitarist and conductor Kevin Sherwin. Bailey has also appeared as a violist with the American Baroque Orchestra, the Arcadia Players, Schola Cantorum at Yale University, and The Sebastians. His compositions and arrangements have been performed by Tafelmusik Baroque Orchestra, which commissioned several works from Mr. Bailey for their 2011-2012 season opener, and other works of his have premiered at Lincoln Center, Yale University, Emmanuel Episcopal Church, Boston, and throughout the United States, as well as at St. Basil’s Cathedral in Moscow, Russia. Approximately forty of his compositions have been published.

Bailey has won praise for his leadership of the Yale Russian Chorus. His first recording with the YRC in 1996 was placed on The New York Times critics’ choice list and described as a must-have recording by National Public Radio’s Performance Today. Bailey left the chorus in 2017 following internal friction about the direction of the group. Mark Bailey's most recent recording, "Heart of Kyiv," is a compilation of Slavic works from the 17th and 18th centuries with Mr. Bailey leading Pro Coro Canada. Among the many outstanding reviews of Mr. Bailey's concerts, City Arts of Seattle wrote of the Rachmaninoff All-Night Vigil, "Bailey elicited expressive phrasing that enhanced every detail of the text’s meaning" (September 2015). Another performance with Cappella Romana: "the choir followed Bailey’s detailed, expressive direction with rapt focus…they sounded like one solitary living creature, the expansion and contraction of the music coming as naturally as breath" (Northwest Reverb).

From 1992 to 2008, Bailey served on the faculty of St. Vladimir's Orthodox Theological Seminary in Crestwood, New York, where he taught composition, analysis, choral leadership, and Church Slavonic. He also served on the conducting staff for the chapel choirs, and he founded the Composers Seminar at St. Vladimir’s in 2007 and 2008. Bailey continues to teach and conduct Orthodox sacred music at various conferences and seminars throughout North America. He teaches conducting and performance practice to a select number of students, and is a Fellow at Davenport College, Yale University.

Bailey is currently the Laurence C. Witten II Curator of the Yale Collection of Historical Sound Recordings (HSR). In this role, he oversees the archival procedures, curation, and listening access standards for over 280,000 rare and historic audio materials at Yale University. With HSR, he has presented on early sound recordings and performance practice at institutions including the Smithsonian, Oxford, Cambridge, the University of Surrey, the University of Oregon, Indiana University, and Festival Casals 50. Mr. Bailey is also the co-founder of Celebrating Romantic-Era Performance Practice, an online group of over 570 members.

Outside his musical work, he is an active animal advocate involved with several rescue and sanctuary organizations.
