= Eastman Wind Ensemble =

Musical ensemble

The Eastman Wind Ensemble was founded by conductor Frederick Fennell at the Eastman School of Music in 1952. The ensemble is often credited with helping redefine the performance of wind band music. Considered one of America's leading wind ensembles, its core personnel of 50 players consists of undergraduate and graduate students at the Eastman School of Music.

Fennell redefined the wind band by having one player on each part, using only the instrumentation for each piece specified by the composer. Fennell coined the term "wind ensemble" to refer to this specific kind of wind band. The repertoire of the group included standard concert band pieces, but also chamber music for winds, and the instrumentation varied as required. In contrast to typical concert band practice, the Eastman Wind Ensemble kept its focus on original wind music rather than orchestral transcriptions. The Eastman Wind Ensemble has premiered over 150 works, including works by composers Bernard Rands and Joseph Schwantner. Under Fennell's leadership, the Eastman Wind Ensemble became known as the pioneering force in the symphonic wind band movement in the United States and abroad. Donald Hunsberger became conductor in 1965 and, for 37 years, led the ensemble to international prominence.

Ever since its founding, the EWE has sought to elevate the wind repertory through recordings. Fennell’s Mercury Recording albums of the 1950s and early ’60s used new binaural, stereo, and 35mm recording techniques. These “Living Presence” recordings focused on standard band literature by the respected classical composers. They also centered on major repertory not found on traditional band programs, such as Hindemith’s Symphony in B-flat, Schoenberg’s Theme and Variations, op. 43a, and Stravinsky’s Symphonies of Wind Instruments.

== History ==
Under Hunsberger, the EWE continued its progressive stance in recording techniques with participation in quadraphonic and digital recording on the Deutsche Grammophon, Phillips, CBS Masterworks (now Sony Classical), Toshiba EMI, Tioch (now KEF), Vox, Centaur, and Desto labels. The album Carnaval, a collaboration with Wynton Marsalis, was nominated for a Grammy award in 1987 and reintroduced the public to an entire tradition of cornet showpieces for band. Other Sony Classical releases have featured new transcriptions of Bach organ works by Hunsberger, as well as contemporary works. One of the featured pieces on the Live from Osaka album was Joseph Schwantner’s …and the mountains rising nowhere, a work that has become representative of the ensemble’s approach to new music, adventurous tone colors, and innovative compositional techniques. Since its founding, the ensemble has premiered more than 150 new works.

In 1968 the group traveled cross-country, giving a series of concerts that culminated in a performance for the General Session of the MENC (National Association for Music Education) conference in Seattle. The ensemble made subsequent MENC appearances in 1987 and 1996. In 1976, the EWE performed at the College Band Directors National Association National Convention, and in 1978 embarked on a tour of Japan and Southeast Asia. In addition, the release of the 1987 Carnaval disc was followed by a tour with Marsalis to Montreal, Toronto, Boston, Philadelphia, Washington, and New York.

The Eastman Wind Ensemble celebrated its 50th anniversary in February 2002 with a conference of international scope on the wind ensemble and its music. The conference included the premiere of a new work from Pulitzer Prize-winning composer Bernard Rands. The anniversary also coincided with the release of a multi-CD set of recordings compiled by Warner Brothers from sessions in Japan and Rochester over the last several years. put the amount of pieces played here

Between 1990 and 2004, the EWE has embarked on seven summer tours of Japan. These trips have been sponsored by Eastman Kodak and Sony Music Foundation, and have focused on demonstrating Eastman performance techniques and showcasing original works of the repertory. Several of Hunsberger’s Wind Library publications originated as pieces specifically transcribed for these tours, as each tour also featured special arrangements by Hunsberger and Scatterday to display the capabilities of the Ensemble.

The most recent Japan tour in 2004 began a new era for the EWE under the direction of Mark Scatterday and included several performances in Taiwan and China. This Asian tour featured trumpet soloist, James Thompson, as the ensemble recorded concertos by Dana Wilson, Eric Ewazen and Jacques Hetu (Danzante, released on Summit Records in 2006). Also in 2005, Scatterday and the ensemble performed at Carnegie Hall as part of CBDNA’s National Conference on February 26, featuring music by Karel Husa, Roberto Sierra, David Maslanka and Jeff Tyzik. The ensemble’s latest recording entitled Manhattan Music with the Canadian Brass was released in 2008 on Opening Day Records with ArchivMusic.

== Conductors ==
- Frederick Fennell - 1952–1961
- A. Clyde Roller - 1962–1964
- Donald Hunsberger - 1965–2001
- Mark Scatterday - 2002–present

== Selected discography ==
- Hindemith, Schoenberg, and Stravinsky (Mercury Living Presence 1957)
- Carnaval (with Wynton Marsalis) (CBS Masterworks 1987)
- Quiet City and Works by Vaughan Williams, Husa, and Hindemith (with Wynton Marsalis) (CBS Masterworks 1989)
- The Civil War: Its Music and Its Sounds (Beulah 1990)
- Live in Osaka (Sony Classical 1999)
- Danzante (Summit Records 2006)
- Manhattan Music (Opening Day 2008)
- Igor Stravinsky: Octet; L'Histoire du Soldat (Eastman 2013)
- Sierra Live (Summit Records 2017)
- Images: Music of Jeff Tyzik (Summit Records 2018)
- Lightning Air (New Focus 2022)

== See also ==
- Tokyo Kosei Wind Orchestra
