= Paul Parmelee =

Paul Parmelee (May 3, 1925 – January 7, 1993) was an American concert pianist and pedagogue.

Born in Chicago, Parmelee studied with Leola Arnold in nearby Rockford, Illinois. Later studies were at the American Conservatory of Music in Chicago. In 1941, he performed at a Young Person's Concert with the Chicago Symphony Orchestra. In the same year, he played the Franck Variations Symphoniques with the Chicago National Youth Administration Symphony conducted by Irwin Fischer.

During World War II, he served for three years as an entertainment specialist in the South Pacific, playing recitals, chamber music, and with the Judith Anderson Show.

After military service, he studied with Max Landow at the Eastman School of Music. While a student at Eastman, Parmelee premiered Kent Kennan's Concertino for piano and orchestra on May 5, 1947, as part of a new works festival. Further studies occurred at the University of Colorado at Boulder with Storm Bull, the Juilliard School with Olga Samaroff, and Florida State University with Edward Kilenyi Jr. While a doctoral student at FSU, Parmelee performed the Brahms 2nd Piano Concerto with the Florida State University Orchestra conducted by Ernst von Dohnányi.

As a chamber musician, Parmelee performed early in his career with Mischa Mischakoff, Nell Rankin, Michael Rabin, and Morley Meredith. He made his solo New York debut at The Town Hall (New York City) on February 23, 1963.

Parmelee taught at the University of Colorado Boulder from 1947 until 1985. In 1969, he formed a piano trio with fellow CU faculty members Oswald Lehnert (violin) and Jurgen de Lemos (cello). The trio performed for Pablo Casals in 1973, and with his approval, assumed his name for their group. Parmelee left the trio in 1979.

== Commercial Discography ==
George Crumb. Night Music I. with George Crumb, David Burge, Thomas MacCluskey, Louise Toth. Composers Recordings, Inc., 1967.

Johannes Brahms & Charles Ives. Piano Trio no. 2 in C major; Piano Trio (1904). Pablo Casals Trio. Auris Records, 1978.

Charles Eakin. Frames (Series I & II), Owl Recording, Inc., 1985.
