= Houston Symphony =

American symphony orchestra based in Houston, Texas

- Orchestra
- Founded: 1913 (initial); 1930 (refounded)
- Disbanded: 1918
- Location: Houston, Texas, United States
- Concert hall: Jesse H. Jones Hall for the Performing Arts
- Music director: Juraj Valčuha (2022–present)
- Website: https://houstonsymphony.org

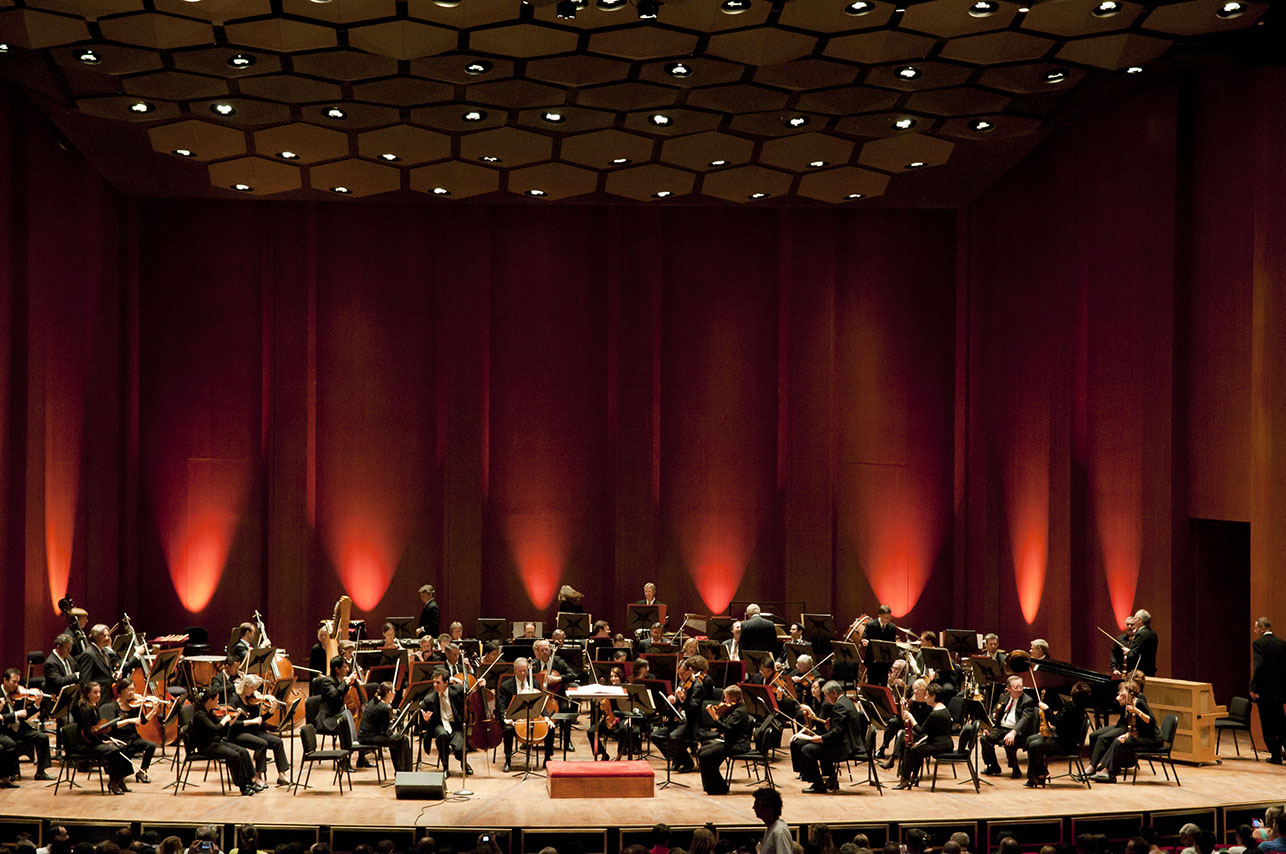
Houston Symphony

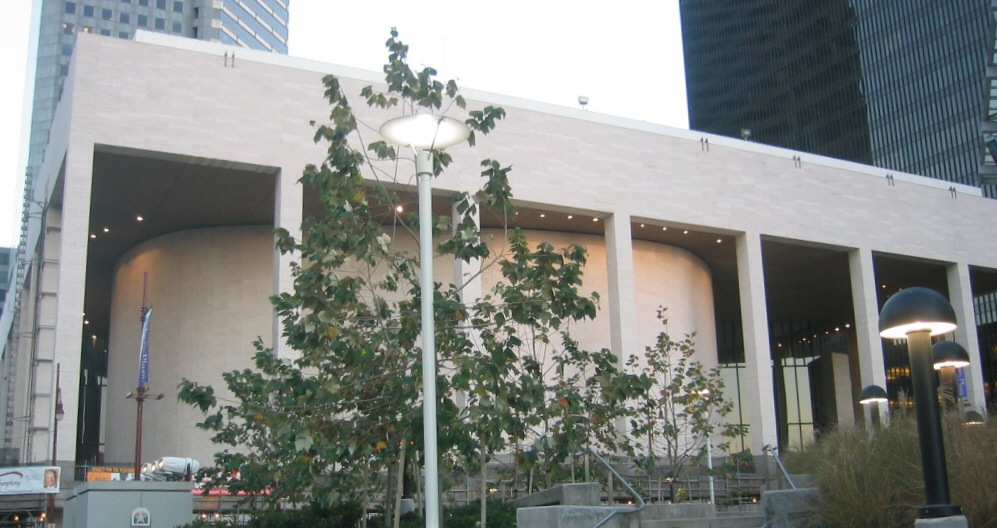
Jones Hall

The Houston Symphony is an American orchestra based in Houston, Texas. The orchestra is resident at the Jesse H. Jones Hall for the Performing Arts.

== History ==
The first concert of what was to become the Houston Symphony took place on June 21, 1913, sponsored by the Houston philanthropist Ima Hogg. Initially, the orchestra was composed of only 35 part-time musicians. Despite its small stature and budget, the orchestra and its first conductor, Julien Paul Blitz, enjoyed a good response and continued to perform. He conducted until 1916, then Paul Bergé, until the orchestra disbanded in 1918.

The orchestra reformed in 1930, still as a semi-professional orchestra, and gave its first full season of concerts the following year conducted by Uriel Nespoli. In the spring of 1936, the symphony society officially became the Houston Symphony Society. Ernst Hoffmann began his tenure that year with increased support from the society and began hiring professional musicians. The orchestra continued to expand over the next several decades, and its first 52-week contract was signed in 1971.

In 1946, the present-day Houston Symphony Chorus was founded as the Houston Chorale, and the chorus has performed with the Houston Symphony since then.

Leopold Stokowski was music director from 1955 to 1961. During his tenure, the Houston Symphony gave the American premiere of the Symphony no. 11 of Dmitri Shostakovich, and subsequently made the first commercial recording of the work. When Stokowski invited African-American opera singer Shirley Verrett to sing with the Houston Symphony in the early 1960s, he was forced to rescind his invitation when the orchestra board refused to accept a black soloist. Stokowski later made amends by giving her a prestigious date with the Philadelphia Orchestra.

The orchestra performed in either the City Auditorium or the Music Hall until the construction in 1966 of the Jesse H. Jones Hall for the Performing Arts. In 2001, the orchestra lost millions of dollars' worth of instruments, music, and archives when Tropical Storm Allison flooded the basement levels of Jones Hall. In 2003, the musicians went on strike for 24 days, and the settlement included a pay cut for the musicians and a reduction in the size of the orchestra.

Hans Graf was the music director of the orchestra from 2001 to 2013, the longest tenure of any Houston Symphony music director. In September 2009, the orchestra announced the conclusion of his tenure as music director at the end of the 2012–2013 season, upon which Graf took the title of conductor laureate of the orchestra.

Andrés Orozco-Estrada became music director in September 2014, with an initial contract of five years. In March 2017, the orchestra announced an extension of Orozco-Estrada's contract through the 2021–2022 season. Orozco-Estrada and the orchestra have recorded commercially for the PENTATONE label. Orozco-Estrada concluded his Houston music directorship at the close of the 2021–2022 season.

Juraj Valčuha first guest-conducted the orchestra in 2011. He returned as a guest conductor twice, in April 2018 and in March 2021. In July 2021, the orchestra announced the appointment of Valčuha as its next music director, effective with the 2022–2023 season. In September 2025, the orchestra announced an extension of Valčuha's contract as its music director through the 2027–2028 season.

Past executive directors and chief executive officers of the orchestra have included John Mangum, who held the post from January 2018 to July 2024. In January 2025, the orchestra announced the appointment of Gary Ginstling as its next executive director and chief executive officer, effective February 3, 2025.

== Music Directors ==
- Julien Paul Blitz (1913–1916)
- Paul Bergé (1916–1918)
- Uriel Nespoli (1931–1932)
- Frank St. Leger (1932–1935)
- Ernst Hoffmann (1936–1947)
- Efrem Kurtz (1948–1954)
- Ferenc Fricsay (1954)
- Leopold Stokowski (1955–1961)
- Sir John Barbirolli (1961–1967)
- André Previn (1967–1969)
- Lawrence Foster (1971–1979)
- Sergiu Comissiona (1980–1988)
- Christoph Eschenbach (1988–1999)
- Hans Graf (2001–2013)
- Andrés Orozco-Estrada (2014–2022)
- Juraj Valčuha (2022–present)

== Conductors laureate ==
- Christoph Eschenbach
- Hans Graf
- Andrés Orozco-Estrada

== Notable musicians, past and present ==
The following Houston Symphony musicians have articles in Wikipedia:

- Arlene Weiss Alda, clarinet, assistant principal 1956–1957
- James Austin, trumpet, principal 1960–1977
- Edward Carroll, trumpet, associate principal 1975–1976
- Wayne Crouse, viola, principal 1951–1983
- Willard Somers Elliot, bassoon 1946–1949
- Paul Ellison, bass, principal 1964–1987
- Armando Ghitalla, trumpet 1948–1950
- Desmond Hoebig, cello, principal 1991–2003
- Frank Huang, violin, concertmaster 2010–2015
- Benjamin Kamins, bassoon, principal 1981–2003
- Julie Landsman, horn, co-principal 1982–1985
- Cristian Măcelaru, violin 2004–2006
- Erik Ralske, horn, associate principal 1987–1993
- Beatrice Schroeder Rose, harp, principal 1953–1984
- Hal Robinson, bass, assistant principal 1977–1985
- Elaine Shaffer, flute, principal 1948–1953
- Joseph Silverstein, violin 1950–1953
- Brinton Averil Smith, cello, principal 2005–present
- Laila Storch, oboe, principal 1948–1955
- John McLaughlin Williams, violin 1981–1982
- Harold Wright, clarinet, c. 1949–1952
