= John Marcellus =

American trombonist (1939–2024)

John Robert Marcellus (September 17, 1939 – December 31, 2024) was a trombone musician and teacher. He was Professor of Trombone at the Eastman School of Music of the University of Rochester and Chair of the Woodwind, Brass, and Percussion Department. In addition to his trombone teaching responsibilities at Eastman, Marcellus was the conductor of the Eastman Trombone Choir, Eastman Bionic Bones (jazz trombone ensemble), and the trombonist with the Eastman Brass. Marcellus joined the faculty of the Eastman School in 1978, and was named the Kilbourn Professor from 1982 to 1983. He succeeded the trombonist and teacher Emory Remington, who served as Professor of Trombone at Eastman close to 50 years. Marcellus retired in 2014 after 36 years at Eastman.

== Education ==
John Marcellus held a B.S. degree in music education from the University of Maryland and M.M. and D.M.A. degrees from The Catholic University of America. His trombone teachers included William F. Cramer (former professor of trombone at Florida State University), Lewis Van Haney (second trombonist with the New York Philharmonic from 1946 to 1963), Edward Herman (principal trombonist with the New York Philharmonic from 1956 to 1985), Gordon Pulis (principal trombonist with the New York Philharmonic from 1946 to 1956), and Armand Sarro (former trombonist with the National Symphony Orchestra). His conducting teachers included Richard Lert of the American Symphony Orchestra League and Lloyd Geisler, associate conductor of the National Symphony Orchestra and Catholic University of America.

== Professional positions ==
John Marcellus served as professor of trombone at the Eastman School of Music (1978–2014), music director and conductor of the Brighton Symphony Orchestra (1980–2014). He also taught at the Chautauqua Institute and served as the principal trombonist with the Chautauqua Symphony Orchestra.

Previous to joining the faculty of the Eastman School in 1978, Marcellus served as the principal trombonist with the National Symphony Orchestra (Washington, DC) for 13 years, and also served as the associate principal trombonist with the Baltimore Symphony Orchestra, soloist with the United States Navy Band, and served as principal tuba with the Jacksonville Symphony Orchestra at the age of 16.

Marcellus was the first trombone and tuba instructor on the faculty of the North Carolina School for the Arts from 1965 to 1968. In Washington, D.C., he served on the faculties of Catholic University from 1966 to 1978, Howard University from 1967 to 1970, American University from 1968 to 1978 and the Interlochen Arts Academy from 1982 to 1983.

He served as guest conductor at the National Music Camp at Interlochen in 1982. Other musical groups that he played with or conducted include the Penfield Symphony Orchestra, Brighton Symphony Orchestra, Chautauqua Symphony Orchestra, Rochester Philharmonic, Buffalo Philharmonic, St. Louis Symphony, Syracuse Symphony Orchestra, Baltimore Symphony Orchestra, and Jacksonville Symphony Orchestra. He performed as a soloist with the U.S. Navy Band in Washington D.C. (1960–1964), the National Symphony Orchestra Brass Quintet, Washington Theatre Chamber Players, and the Contemporary Music Forum, as well as performing solo recitals in London, Paris, Cologne, Stuttgart, Birmingham, Manchester, Japan, Sweden, Finland, Austria, Holland, Poland, and Denmark.

His close association with the International Trombone Association included appearances in workshops since 1972. He was one of its founding board members and served as its president in 1988–1990). Other workshops in which he performed recitals and solos included the 1976 International Brass Congress in Montreux, Switzerland, 1981 Low Brass Workshop at McGill University in Montreal, the Eastern Trombone Workshop since 1974, the Eastern Music Festival, Brevard Music Center, and Norfolk Chamber Orchestra. He served as co-director of the Eastern Trombone Workshop along with John Melick held at Towson State University (1974–1979) in Baltimore, Maryland. In 1980 the workshop moved to Florida State University, under the direction of Prof. William F. Cramer; in 1981 the workshop was hosted by Bill Campbell at the University of Miami. The U.S. Navy Band, under Chief Phillips (a Cramer student) took control of the workshop in 1983, thus bringing the event back to the DC area. In 1993, U.S. Army Band solo trombonist Scott Shelsta, with support of Colonel Bryan Shelburn, commander of The U.S. Army Band, took hold of the reins of ETW. In 2014, at the 40th edition of the Workshop, Colonel Thomas Palmatier unveiled the workshop's new name: The U.S. Army Band's American Trombone Workshop.

== Publications ==
- Several publications in the National Association of College Wind and Percussion Instructors Journal, The Instrumentalist and Accent
- Arrangements published by Kendor, Belwin-Mills, Kagarice Brass Editions, Briar Music. Ensemble publications.

== Discography ==
- Recordings on London/Decca, Nonesuch, Library of Congress, Turnabout, Opus One, Stolat, and Sine Qua Non.
- Solo CD, Songs, Dances, and Incantations: American Music for Trombone, on Albany Records (2002).
- Other CDs: Calls and Echoes with Eastman Brass, Eastman CD Series;
- Eastman Trombone Choir 60th Anniversary CD, Eastman CD Series.

== Honors ==
- He received the International Trombone Association's Highest Award for Pedagogy, Performance and Literature in 1999. A Lifetime Achievement Award from the International Trombone Association and the Neil Humfield Teaching Award in 2011 and a Lifetime Achievement Award from the Eastern Trombone Workshop in 2011.
- He was honored for his outstanding career as a musician and educator in April, 1997 by the New York Brass Conference for Scholarships at their Silver Jubilee Brass Conference in New York City.
- In 1997, he was given the Mu Phi Epsilon Musician of the Year award.
