= Frederick Fennell =

American conductor (1914–2004)

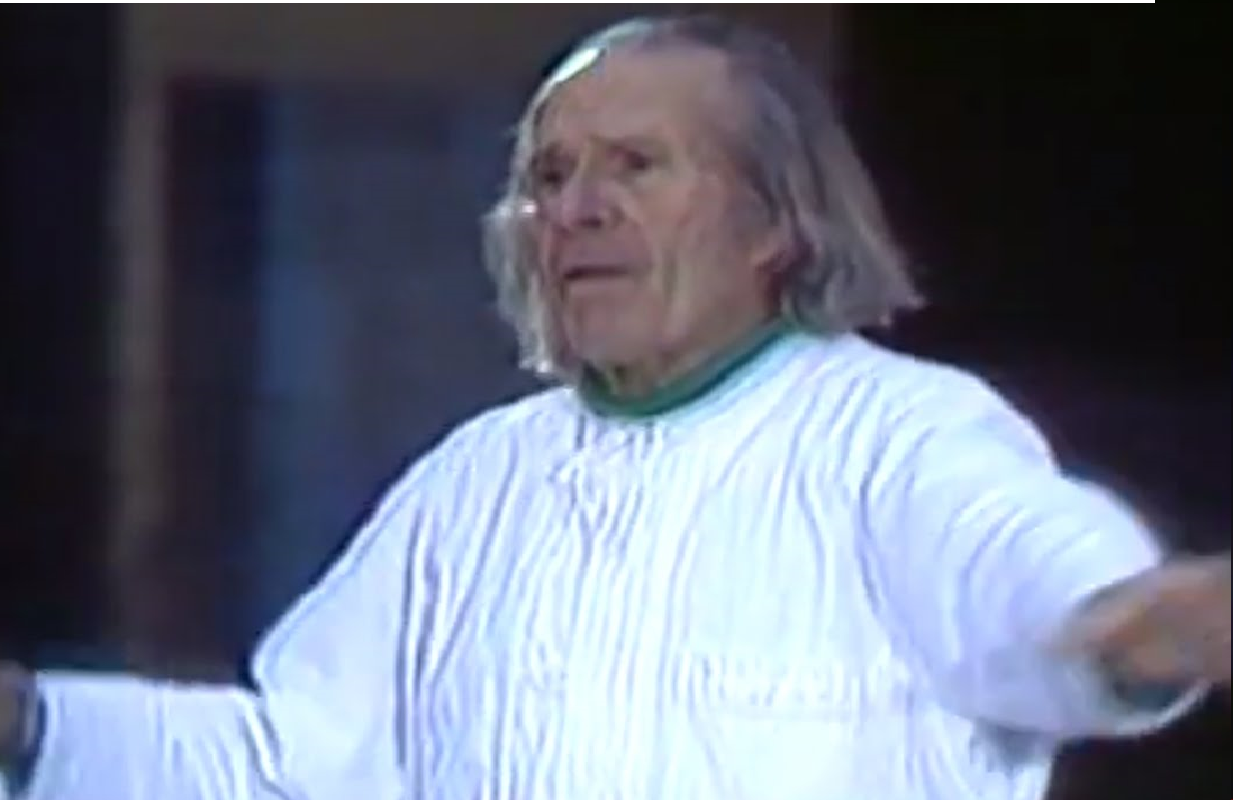
- Frederick Fennell conducting the United States Navy Band

Background information
- Born: July 2, 1914; Cleveland, Ohio
- Died: December 7, 2004 (aged 90) Siesta Key, Florida
- Occupation: Conductor
- Instrument: Drums

Frederick Fennell /fəˈnɛl/ (July 2, 1914 – December 7, 2004) was an American conductor and one of the primary figures who promoted the Eastman Wind Ensemble as a performing group. He was also influential as a band pedagogue, and greatly affected the field of music education in the US and abroad. In Fennell's New York Times obituary, colleague Jerry F. Junkin was quoted as saying "He was arguably the most famous band conductor since John Philip Sousa."

== Early life ==
Fennell was born on July 2, 1914, in Cleveland, Ohio. He chose piccolo as his primary instrument at the age of seven, as drummer in the fife-and-drum corps at the family's encampment called Camp Zeke. He owned his first drum set at age ten. In the John Adams High School orchestra, Fennell performed as the kettledrummer and served as the band's drum major.

His studies at the Interlochen Arts Camp (then the National Music Camp) included being chosen by famed bandmaster Albert Austin Harding as the bass drummer in the National High School Band in 1931. The band was conducted by John Philip Sousa on July 26, the program including the premiere of Sousa's Northern Pines march. Fennell himself conducted at Interlochen at the age of seventeen.

Fennell formed a compatible and fruitful relationship with the Eastman School of Music in Rochester, New York. As a student, he organized the first University of Rochester marching band for the football team and held indoor concerts with the band after the football season for ten years. At Eastman, he completed his bachelor's and master's degrees (in 1937 and 1939). Fennell became the first person to whom the Eastman School of Music awarded a degree in percussion performance. He was also awarded a fellowship that allowed him to study at the Mozarteum Salzburg in 1938, where he took several courses with Herbert Albert and visited several times with the festival's chief conductor, the renowned Wilhelm Furtwängler. Returning, he sailed on the SS Bremen from Southampton on September 3, 1938. For the purpose of the passenger manifest, he signed his name as Frederick Putnam Fennell (a rare use of his middle name).

Fennell also studied conducting with Serge Koussevitzky at the Berkshire Music Center at Tanglewood in 1942 (with classmates Leonard Bernstein, Lukas Foss and Walter Hendl). He was appointed Koussevitzky's assistant at the Center in 1948. In 1944, a California newspaper pictured Fennell examining donated musical instruments for WWII servicemen; he was described as the "national USO (United Service Organizations) musical advisor for San Diego County."

== Eastman Wind Ensemble ==
While Fennell was recuperating from hepatitis for six weeks in 1952, the idea for a new, smaller type of symphonic band occurred to him: scaling the typical concert band down to the size of the wind section of a symphony orchestra, allowing for greater clarity and better intonation. He recruited nearly 40 players in May 1952 for this, explaining, “I chose the best students in the school, the best solo performers and the best ensemble players." On September 20, 1952, he conducted the first rehearsal for this new Eastman Wind Ensemble, and its first concert at Eastman's Kilbourn Hall on February 8, 1953. Desiring expanded repertoire, he wrote to nearly 400 composers around the world commissioning appropriate compositions for the new group. The first three composers to respond were Percy Grainger, Vincent Persichetti and Ralph Vaughan Williams.

== Fennell's recordings ==
Conducting the Eastman Wind Ensemble, the Tokyo Kosei Wind Orchestra and various other groups, Fennell recorded many of the standards of the wind band repertoire. He became one of America's most-recorded conductors. Starting with "American Concert Band Masterpieces" in 1953, Fennell recorded over 300 compositions on 29 albums for Mercury Records with the Eastman-Rochester "Pops", London "Pops" (actually the London Symphony Orchestra in shirt-sleeves), and free-lance groups of New York musicians. However, best known are the 22 of the 29 Mercury releases made with Fennell's own Eastman Wind Ensemble. One of these albums, Lincolnshire Posy, with music by Percy Grainger (recorded in 1958), was selected by Stereo Review magazine as one of the 50 best recordings of the Centenary of the Phonograph 1877-1977. The two-volume Civil War-Its Music and Its Sounds, recorded in December 1960, was a notable set also made with the Eastman Wind Ensemble, this time performing on period or original instruments. In 1961, Fennell received a citation and a medal from the Congressional Committee for the Centennial of the Civil War for this album. In 2003, the 1958 Mercury album Winds in Hi-Fi was chosen by the National Recording Preservation Board for the National Recording Registry.

Nearly all of Fennell's Mercury recordings were reissued on compact disc. Fennell and the Eastman Wind Ensemble were also featured in the premiere issuance of Mercury material on compact disc. In 1986, 24 Sousa marches performed by the Eastman Wind Ensemble were transferred to compact disc by Philips Records, which now owned the Mercury catalog.

Fennell made the first symphonic digital recording in the United States for Telarc with the Cleveland Symphonic Winds, on April 4–5, 1978. The recording included the two Suites for Military Band by Gustav Holst. With the Dallas Wind Symphony, Fennell recorded five programs of music by Nelhybel, Albeniz, Grainger, Bernstein and more, for Reference Recordings. Fennell also recorded for Brain, Columbia Records, Delos, King, Kosei, Ludwig, Premier Recordings, and Sine Qua Non Superba not to mention the Library of Congress label.

== Career After Eastman ==
Fennell was associate music director of the Minneapolis Symphony Orchestra (later renamed the Minnesota Orchestra) from 1962 to 1964. In September 1965 he became conductor-in-residence at the University of Miami, where he conducted its symphony orchestra and also founded a wind ensemble. He also served as the resident conductor of the Miami Philharmonic from 1974 to 1975, and as principal guest conductor of the Interlochen Arts Academy and Dallas Wind Symphony. At the invitation of its players, he was appointed the initial conductor of the Tokyo Kosei Wind Orchestra in 1984.

On the podium, he evinced a courtly yet commanding manner despite his diminutive (5'1") stature. He was known to take charge of a room with words alone, and his conducting was extremely animated. His conducting workshops were famous for including calisthenics and baton-technique exercises in swimming pools. He remained highly active in the world of conducting until a few months before his death at his Siesta Key, Florida, home on December 7, 2004, at the age of 90. At the time, he was conductor laureate of the Tokyo Kosei Wind Orchestra; principal guest conductor of the Dallas Wind Symphony; and professor emeritus at the University of Miami Frost School of Music.

== Awards and honors ==
Fennell received Columbia University's Alice M. Ditson Conductor's Award in 1969, was presented the Star of the Order from the John Philip Sousa Memorial Foundation in 1985, received an honorary doctorate from Eastman in 1988, and was inducted into the National Band Association Hall of Fame of Distinguished Band Conductors in 1990. He received the Theodore Thomas Award of the Conductor's Guild in 1994. He was also inducted into the American Classical Music Hall of Fame in 2001. In 2003, he received the Charles E. Lutton Man of Music Award from Phi Mu Alpha Sinfonia at its national convention in Washington, DC.

Fennell was said to be most fond of the honorary doctorate he was awarded from Eastman, being inducted as an honorary chief of the Kiowa Nation in the 1960s, and receiving a medal of honor from Interlochen in 1989. He made frequent appearances guest conducting such ensembles as the Boston Pops Orchestra 1949 to 1978, Buffalo Philharmonic Orchestra, Cleveland Orchestra, London Symphony Orchestra, the United States Marine Band, Interlochen Arts Academy, and the Interlochen Arts Camp. In 1997, he became the first civilian to conduct an entire concert with the United States Marine Band; and in July 1998 he repeated this at a concert in the Kennedy Center celebrating the 200th anniversary of the Marine Band.

Fennell was a brother of Phi Mu Alpha Sinfonia, the national fraternity for men in music (initiated into the Fraternity's Alpha Nu Chapter at the Eastman School of Music in 1934), and Kappa Kappa Psi, the National Honorary Band Fraternity.

Frederick Fennell Hall was dedicated in Kofu, Japan on July 17, 1992. On April 4, 2006, the Interlochen Center for the Arts opened up state of the art music and academic libraries, with the music library named in honor and memory of Fennell and his wife, Elizabeth Ludwig Fennell.

Fennell died in Siesta Key, Florida on December 7, 2004. His daughter, Catherine Fennell Martensen, stated that on his deathbed Fennell had said, "I cannot die without a drummer." She added that his last words were: "I hear him. I'm O.K. now."

== Fennell's writings ==
Fennell wrote several books: Time and the Winds, a Short History of the Use of Wind Instruments in the Orchestra, Band and the Wind Ensemble, 1954; The Drummer’s Heritage, a Collection of Popular Airs and Official U.S. Army Music for Fifes and Drums, 1956; and The Wind Ensemble, 1988. Fennell was commissioned by Grenadilla Music to write a major article on 20th Century band composers and their music. The article was published in volume one of "Panorama of 20th Century Classical Music" subtitled, "BAND! (Wind Ensembles, Brass & Concert Bands" and is currently available at www.grenadillamusic.com.

He also edited for several music publishers: Boosey & Hawkes, Carl Fischer, Theodore Presser, and Sam Fox. For the Fennell Editions at Ludwig Music he edited over 50 scores for band performance, including many marches. One of these editions published in 1981 was for his favorite march, National Emblem by Edwin Eugene Bagley. He also wrote a series of sixteen articles published in The Instrumentalist under the heading ‘Basic Band Repertory’ beginning in April 1975 and concluding in February 1984. These articles were devoted to what Fennell called "...indestructible masterpieces for band that have survived the ravages of time and many an inept conductor".

Fennell wrote an original march in 1951, "Tally-Ho March," in honor of the Tally-Ho Music Camp and its founders, Fred and Dorotha Bradley.

In 1937, Fennell married Dorothy Codner, a violinist he met at Eastman School of Music. They remained happily married for thirty three years.

== Selected discography ==
- Eastman Wind Ensemble, Frederick Fennell, conductor. American Concert Band Masterpieces. Mercury Records MG40006/MG50079, 1953.
- Eastman Wind Ensemble, Frederick Fennell, conductor. Marches by Sousa and Other. Mercury Records MG40007/MG50080, 1953.
- Eastman Wind Ensemble, Frederick Fennell, conductor. La Fiesta Mexicana. Mercury Records MG40011/MG50084, 1954.
- Eastman Wind Ensemble, Frederick Fennell, conductor. Folk Song Suites and Other British Band Classics. Mercury Records MG40015/MG50088, 1955.
- Eastman Wind Ensemble, Frederick Fennell, conductor. Marching Along. Mercury Records MG50105/MWS5-14/SR90105, 1956.
- Eastman Wind Ensemble, Frederick Fennell, conductor. Hindemith/Schoenberg/Stravinsky. Mercury Records MG501434/SR90143, 1957.
- Eastman Wind Ensemble, Frederick Fennell, conductor. British Band Classic, Vol. 2. Mercury Records MG50197/SR90197, 1958.
- Eastman Wind Ensemble, Frederick Fennell, conductor. Sousa on Review (Marches by John Philip Sousa). Mercury Records MG50284/SR90284, 1961.
- Eastman Wind Ensemble, Frederick Fennell, conductor. Screamers! (Circus Marches). Mercury Records MG50314/SR90314, 1957.

Cultural offices
| Preceded by none (founder) | Conductor of the Eastman Wind Ensemble; 1952–1961 | Succeeded by A. Clyde Roller |
| Preceded by Tetsusaburo Hirai | Conductor of Tokyo Kosei Wind Orchestra; 1984–2000 | Succeeded by Douglas Bostock |
