= Bravo Music =

Music recording and publishing company

- Industry: Music & Entertainment
- Genre: Classical
- Founded: Florida, United States (1999)
- Founder: Ken Murakami
- Headquarters: Florida, United States
- Area served: Americas, Europe, Africa and Oceania
- Products: Sheet music, CD, DVD, Video, band training methods
- Parent: Brain Music
- Website: bravomusicinc.com

Bravo Music is a concert band music publishing company, founded in 1999. Located in Deerfield Beach, Florida, it is a subsidiary of Hiroshima-based Brain Music. It is one of the few companies to offer original Japanese sheet music and recordings to America and Europe.

== Profile ==
Bravo Music is a music sales and distribution company. Brain Music, and its parent company and principal is Brain Music of Hiroshima. Bravo is involved in the sale of sheet music, CD, DVDs, the majority of which are produced in Japan. It has a large range of recordings from the All Japan Band Competition, the "world's largest music contest", which represents 14,000 bands from all age levels. It also offers original works and transcriptions for wind ensembles by Japanese and international composers, such as Yasuhide Ito, Satoshi Yagisawa, Toshio Mashima, Yo Goto, James Barnes, Wataru Hokoyama and Tetsunosuke Kushida. Bravo Music's sales territories include all of the North, Central and South America, Europe, Africa, Oceania and the Middle East.

== History ==
Bravo's parent company, Brain Music, was founded in 1976 in Hiroshima, Japan. Brain is a recording/publishing company specializing in wind, classical, traditional and vocal music. Brain also cooperates with the All-Japan Band Association and other organizations to record and sell products related to their annual national band contests. Bravo was formed in 1999 as the distributor for Brain DVDs, CDs, and sheet music in addition to their own products. Their product range has increased over time, to just under 1,500 titles as of January 2013.
