= School band =

Group of student musicians who rehearse and perform instrumental music together

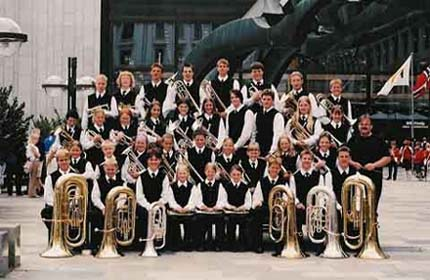
Sveio School band at the Norwegian Championship in 2002

A school band is a group of student musicians who rehearse and perform instrumental music together. A concert band is usually under the direction of one or more conductors (band directors). A school band consists of woodwind instruments, brass instruments and percussion instruments, although upper level bands may also have string basses or bass guitar.

School bands in the United Kingdom are generally similar to those in the US although pure brass bands are more commonplace in schools than in the US. Some countries usually prefer certain special types of bands, usually drums, over conventional ones. The school band movement in Japan is unusually strong, organized around an enormous competition system administered by the All-Japan Band Association. Many international observers of Japanese school bands consider them to be the most impressive in the world, particularly among very young students, and Japan is also home to one of the world's leading professional concert bands, the Tokyo Kosei Wind Orchestra.

== Elementary and middle school bands ==
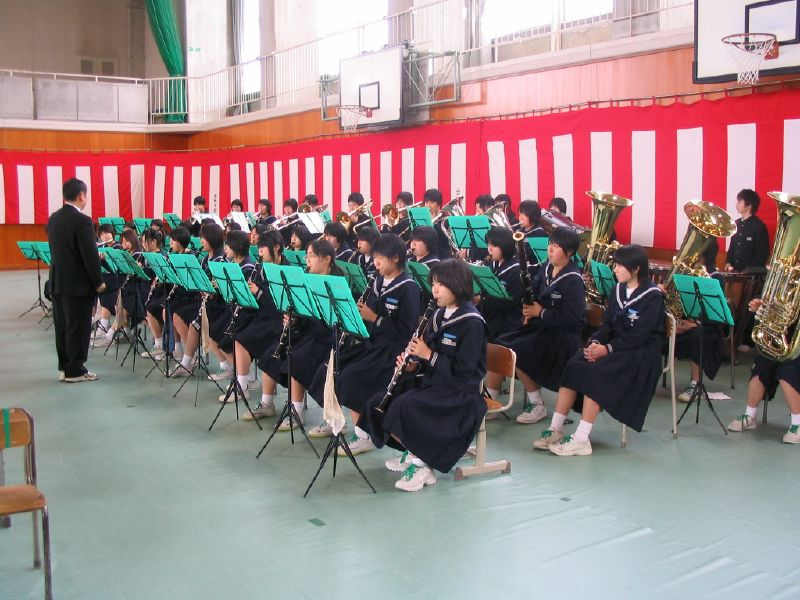
Junior High School Students band at Demachi Jr. High, Tonami City, Toyama, Japan

Although some children learn an instrument prior to entering middle school (or junior high), students in music education programs within the United States and Canada generally start daily band classes in the 6th or 7th Grade. Many band programs begin as early as 4th or 5th grade. The students usually make up a band based on their grades, which may then be broken up into sectionals to provide better instrument-specific instruction. It is sometimes required for beginner students to play a recorder for a year before learning another instrument, so that basics, such as scales, embouchure, etc. can be taught easily. Other requirements may include learning a piano or guitar to understand basic music theory, notation, etc.

A "beginning" band, consisting of the youngest students in the school, usually gives two or three concerts a year, and may participate in a local/state contest. These bands are given easy music to learn, often with many duplicate parts and simple rhythms. Students sometimes may be required to memorize the 12 major scales. Depending upon the size of the school, there may be one to three "higher level" bands after the beginning band. These bands are usually divided similarly to high school bands. Some schools require students to audition and be placed in a band according to their ability on their instrument. Others will assign students based on their performance as seen in class. Yet others will simply sort the students according to their age or grade level. Most of these decisions are decided by the conductor. These higher level bands will occasionally play in high school games and pep rallies to augment the local high school band, although in small schools they always come to these events. Beginning bands are usually used on the spot of an elective.

Instruments typically in beginning bands:

- Woodwind:
  - Flutes
  - Clarinets
  - Alto, tenor, and baritone saxophones
- Brass:
  - Tubas
  - Trombones
  - Trumpets
  - French horns
  - Baritones or euphoniums
- Percussion:
  - Drums, including bass and snare
  - Timpani
  - Glockenspiel and/or xylophone
  - Cymbals
  - Tambourine
  - Tubular Bells

== High school bands ==
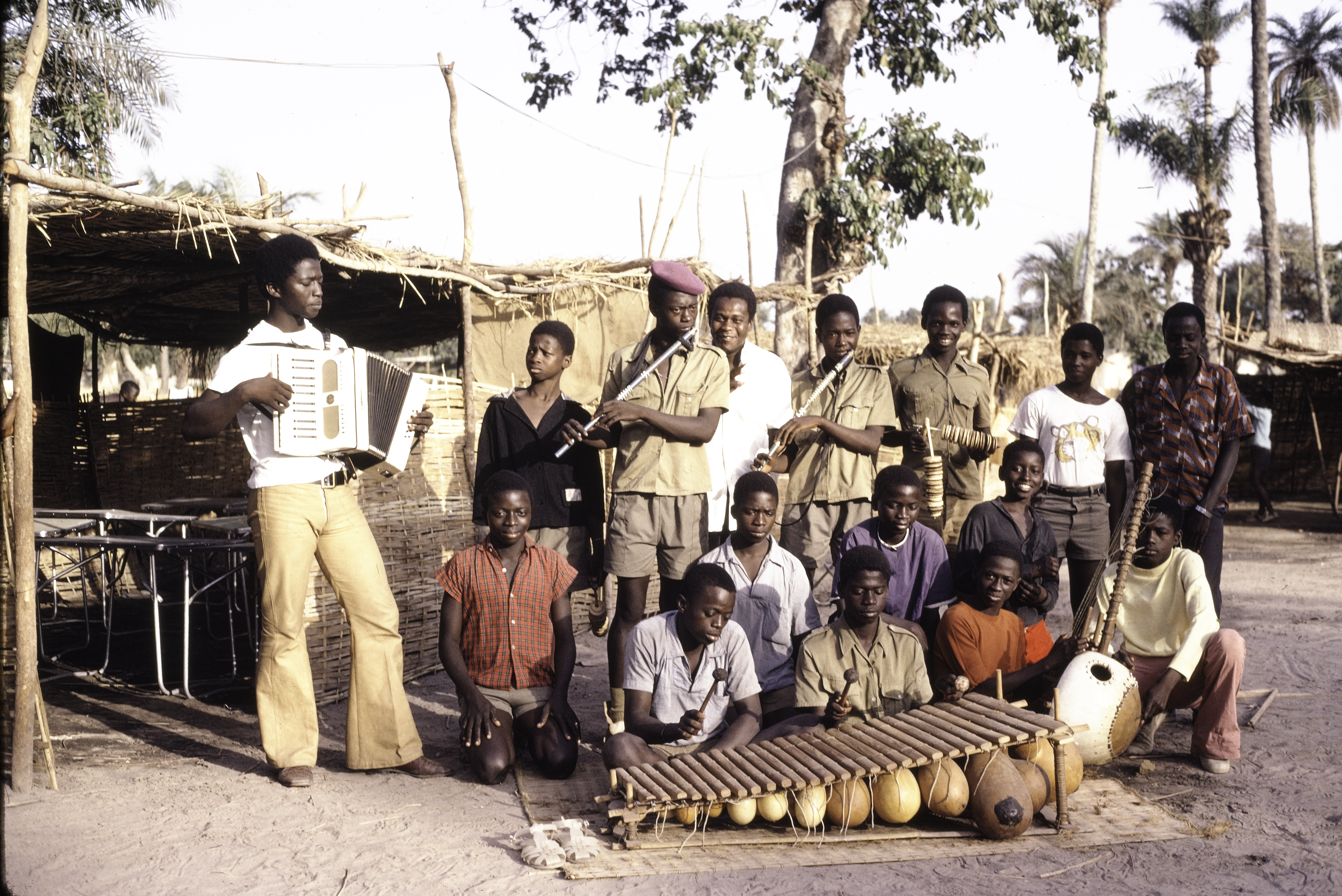
PAIGC High school band in Ziguinchor, Senegal, 1973

High school bands typically challenge students musically more than those in middle school. Music is much more difficult with more complex passages, intricate rhythms and more involved phrasing. Selections also vary in style. A well-rounded band is expected to be able to play a wide variety of music, ranging from serious 'program music' to lighter 'pop-style' music. For many high school students, school bands are the main form of music education available to them in school. Marches were the first major contributions to the wind band repertoire. There are many pieces other than marches written for wind band at present, but there are some historical standards that should be included into the repertoire of advanced ensembles. Some of the most notable of these pieces are Holst's First Suite in E-flat and Second Suite in F, and Grainger's Children's March and Lincolnshire Posy among others.

Below is a list of the instrumentation in a typical concert band at the high school level. The number of instruments in each section varies, but listed below are usually the average number of members. Middle school/junior high bands are usually around the upper values for each instrument. Instrumentation in beginner bands is usually much larger than this. College and professional bands generally have smaller numbers of players. These numbers may vary widely, based on the instrument and the people playing them (as many people playing instruments such as trombones may drop out, causing others to change instruments to fill the need). Some bands have a set number of performers per section while other bands have open unlimited participation.

Woodwind

- 1 or no piccolo in C
- 8–10 flutes
- 1–2 oboes
- 1 or no English horn
- 1–2 bassoons
- 1 or no E♭ clarinet
- 8–24 B♭ clarinets
- 1 or no E♭ alto clarinet
- 1–2 B♭ bass clarinets
- 1 or no EE♭ contra-alto clarinet
- 1 or no BB♭ contrabass clarinet
- 1 or no B♭ soprano saxophone
- 4–6 E♭ alto saxophones
- 2–3 B♭ tenor saxophones
- 1–2 E♭ baritone saxophones

Brass

- 8–10 B♭ trumpets
- 4–6 horns in F
- 3–9 trombones (sometimes including 1 bass trombone)
- 1–4 baritone horns or euphoniums
- 1–4 tubas

Strings

- 1 or no string bass or electric bass

Percussion

- Snare drum
- Tom-toms
- Bass drum
- Cymbals (including crash, ride, and suspended)
- Tambourine
- 2 playing mallet percussion (including orchestra bells, xylophone, marimba, chimes and vibraphone)
- 1 Timpani
- 1 Drum kit
- A variety of other auxiliary percussion instruments used on specific pieces, including cabasa, triangle, and maracas

In most bands, strings (besides the string bass) are not used. If they are, the band is generally considered an orchestra (in which case saxophones would generally not be used).

The first high school band in the United States was the Boston Farm and Trade School Band, founded in 1856. The oldest high school band in America is The Christian Brothers Band (Memphis) founded in 1872.

== College bands ==
In higher education institutions, numerous colleges and universities offer band programs as formal courses, often integrated within a broader musical curriculum. These courses provide students with a structured and educational platform to develop their musical talents, fostering a deeper understanding of musical theory, technique, and ensemble performance.

These college bands distinguish themselves from their high school counterparts by their larger size and elevated musical proficiency. The expanded membership and diverse skill levels within these collegiate bands contribute to a richer and more complex musical experience. Students enrolled in these programs typically demonstrate a higher level of musical aptitude and dedication, as the collegiate setting allows for a more specialized and advanced exploration of musical concepts.

== Other school bands ==
There are many other school band opportunities for students. Most of these fall under the jurisdiction of the director that teaches the daily band classes, whether or not the smaller groups meet daily or during school hours.

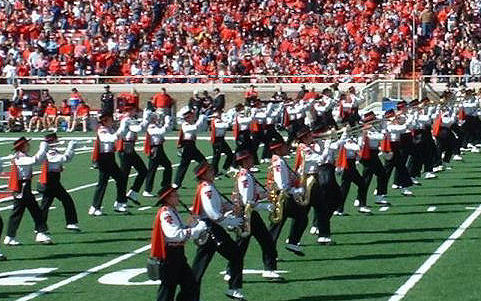
Goin' Band from Raiderland, a college marching band in the United States

=== Marching band ===
Many schools, especially high schools in the United States, have a marching band. A school marching band may contain from 11 to over 500 students. Marching bands typically practice during the late summer and early fall and most often attend their school's football games, playing music in the stands, and marching a show during halftime. A marching show is an intricate, choreographed performance that includes playing and marching at the same time. The visual aspect consists of coordinated movements by each member of the band to create elaborate shapes and formations on the field, which are known as drill patterns. Most bands will also have a color guard to add dimension and needed flair to the visuals. "Through the masterfully exciting incorporation of dance, flag, rifle, and sabre (no, not real weapons - just ceremonial), the Color Guard literally “brings to life” the music you hear. When it all comes together (the music, the dance, the colorful additions) it can tell quite a story ... like a Broadway Musical.". A show is usually between 6 and 10 minutes long, but many competitions place restrictions on length. Bands often compete in marching band competitions throughout the marching season (typically the same time as football season). Competitions vary in intensity. Some areas have many smaller, local competitions hosted by individual schools. Others host a regional competition. Others, such as Bands of America competitions are nationally known and take place in professional arenas.

In addition to their show, marching bands often march parades. Often this is limited to their city or town's municipal parades, but some bands travel to participate in well known parades, such as the Macy's Thanksgiving Day Parade or the Tournament of Roses Parade on New Years Day.

=== Concert band ===
Concert bands, also known as symphonic bands, wind ensembles, and wind bands are some of the most common school bands in the U.S. and around the world. They consist of wind instruments like woodwinds and brass as well as a percussion ensemble. Concert band is "often the first opportunity for formal musical training that American [and non-American] children encounter." It is most commonly a class on the students daily school schedule and provides an environment, under the direction of an appointed band director, that fosters teamwork, cooperation, and enhances the cognitive abilities needed to play an instrument and read music. Instead of competing in competitions like marching band, they get to showcase their musical skill during concerts which are special performances typically held at a concert hall. Many schools will have up to two concert bands, such as, a symphonic for intermediate players and a wind ensemble for the more advanced musicians.

=== Jazz band ===
Many schools have jazz programs in addition to their concert program. Different schools have different time slots for their jazz band. Some meet as an actual class during the school day, while others may choose to practice after school or before school two or three times a week. Meeting as a class during school can often cause schedule conflicts with students' academic classes. Many times jazz band may rehearse during the study hall, free period, or part of the lunch period. Typical instrumentation for jazz ensembles will include trumpets, trombones, alto, tenor and baritone saxophones, a drum set (often called a "trap set"), guitar, bass guitar, piano, clarinet and often, a vibraphone or marimba. Many areas have jazz festivals, but the popularity of these widely vary from different regions of the country. Jazz bands are most often used as an ambassador ensemble for the band program as a whole. In addition, jazz education is seen as growing in popularity as a specialty area within school music departments.

=== Chamber ensembles ===
Schools rarely have chamber music ensembles that meet as real classes, usually depending on the region, state and budget. Most of these groups are ad hoc ensembles put together by the director or the students themselves for a contest or recital. Examples would be clarinet quartets, woodwind quintet, brass quintet, duets, and trios. Groups consisting of the entire woodwind or brass section, or even percussion section of a band are also sometimes formed.

=== All-region bands ===
Perhaps not associated with the individual school, All-Region bands are audition-only groups for the most advanced players in each school. There are many different "All-Region" bands, ranging from the most local "All-County" or "All-District"(when referring to school districts) to the more prestigious "All-State". Many states also have a level between County and State bands which varies in name according to the area. These events are often highly enjoyed by the students that attend them. Musical literature is often increased in difficulty for the concerts, providing a challenge that isn't seen at schools. Students also get to meet new players on their instrument and share stories from their own band experiences. Region bands typically last over a weekend, though some may meet for over a week before performing a concert.

Though not associated with All-State, Florida has a statewide band festival called Festival of Winds, held in Tampa at The University of South Florida in the first weekend of December. Also, Florida, Alabama, and Georgia have a band festival called Tri-State, held in Tallahassee, Florida at Florida State University in the same time period as Festival of Winds.

=== Modern band ===
Modern band is an instrumental and vocal school music program taught in a growing number of public schools systems in the U.S. Instrumentation typically includes acoustic guitar, electric guitar, electric bass, keyboard, vocals, computers and percussion instruments. The repertoire of modern band is evolving as it draws from commercially dominant and contemporary music styles of the day such as pop, rock, disco, reggae, hip-hop and more.

Major public school systems that offer Modern Band programming include those in the New York City Department of Education, Los Angeles Unified School District, Chicago Public Schools and others. Modern band is a new movement in public school music education circles. The term "Modern Band" was coined by a music education non-profit, Music Will, which partners with school districts from economically challenged communities to expand their music programs.

== Stereotypes and popular culture ==
=== "Band geek" ===
"Band geek" or "band nerd" is a high school stereotype of a person obsessed with playing band music. However, the term usually relates to the belief that most people who are in school bands are socially inept. The term is sometimes used to describe any student who plays an instrument and is in a band class (including students in the orchestra). "Orch dork" is a variation specifically for members of school orchestras. These terms have become a label of pride for many band members, being found on T-shirts, bumper stickers, etc.

=== Gender bias and stereotyping in instrument selection ===
Gender associations with different instrument groups have evolved over time. The history of gender bias in music performance has impacted modern perceptions of instrument groups and gender associations with those groups.

Both church and society enforced restrictions during the Middle Ages and Renaissance periods that limited which instruments women were allowed to play. It was common for orchestras to be exclusively made up of male musicians, and women were encouraged to keep their musical practice within the privacy of their home.

In school bands, girls tend to play woodwind instruments (especially the flute) and boys tend to play brass, percussion (especially drums) and the saxophone. However, this is not always the case. Several studies have found that the main factor that affects a student's instrument selection is peer pressure, which includes the pressure to conform to traditional gender expectations in instrument selection.

These stereotypes can be avoided when band directors assess each student for musical capacity, as well as, meet with students individually to analyze their physical characteristics. For example, students of smaller stature would be more successful playing the clarinet over the tuba. Additionally, the role of gender bias in musical instrument assignment is highly debated in the field of music education. Some feel that it should be left alone, while others want to combat it. One way band directors can overcome these stereotypes is to have live demonstrations from musicians playing gender atypical instruments (i.e., males playing flute, females playing tuba).

=== Movies ===
- Popular films with school bands in their storylines:
  - Strike Up the Band, 1940
    - A musical regarding a teen's attempt to meet director Mr. Paul Whiteman.
  - Mr. Holland's Opus, 1995
    - A struggling composer ends up making an impact on the lives of high schoolers through music.
  - Band, 1998
    - A reflection of a school's marching band from summer camp to competition and everything in between.
  - American Pie Series, (American Pie 2 2001); American Pie Band Camp 2005)
    - Although a movie about teen angst, a male teen falls for a female "band geek".
  - Drumline, 2002
    - The members of a collegiate marching band fight their way to get noticed by its director.
- Popular collegiate marching bands used in films
  - USC Trojan Marching Band, over 13 films and 48 Television Shows
  - UCLA Bruin Marching Band, over 20 films
- Popular collegiate marching bands used in film soundtracks
  - University of Southern California Marching Band, 1 film
  - Los Angeles CA Marching Band, 1 film
- Other collegiate bands in movies
  - The University of North Alabama Pride of Dixie Marching Band was featured in the 1994 Academy Award-winning movie Blue Sky

== See also ==
- Music in the Parks
- Buraban
- School Bands in Singapore
