= Education in Memphis, Tennessee =

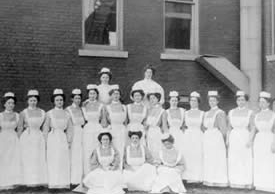
Early nursing class in Memphis

Education in Memphis is home to a range of public and private institutions serving various educational needs of Memphis, Tennessee. At the primary and secondary levels, the metropolitan area is currently served by the Shelby County Schools operating system including the surrounding suburbs, a number of private schools, and some with religious affiliations. Major post-secondary institutions include the Southwest Tennessee Community College, the University of Memphis, Christian Brothers University, Rhodes College and the University of Tennessee Health Science Center.

== Private schools ==
- Bishop Byrne High School
- Briarcrest Christian School
- Christian Brothers High School
- Concord Academy
- Evangelical Christian School
- First Assembly Christian School
- Grace-St. Luke’s Episcopal School
- Hutchison School
- Harding Academy
- Immaculate Conception Cathedral High School
- Lausanne Collegiate School
- Margolin Hebrew Academy/Feinstone Yeshiva of the South MHA/FYOS
- Memphis Catholic High School
- Memphis Jewish High School
- Memphis University School
- Presbyterian Day School (PDS)
- Saint Benedict at Auburndale High School
- St. Agnes Academy-St. Dominic School
- St. Mary's Episcopal School
- Westminster Academy (Tennessee)
- Woodland Presbyterian School (Memphis, Tennessee)
- Grace-St. Luke's Episcopal School

== Colleges and universities ==
- Baptist College of Health Sciences
- Christian Brothers University
- LeMoyne-Owen College
- Memphis College of Art
- Rhodes College (formerly Southwestern at Memphis)
- Southern College of Optometry
- Southwest Tennessee Community College
- Union University - Germantown campus, (Memphis Teacher Residency)
- University of Memphis (formerly Memphis State University)
- University of Tennessee Health Science Center (Colleges of Dentistry, Medicine, Nursing, Pharmacy, Graduate Health Sciences and Allied Health Sciences).
- Victory University (closed, 2014)

=== Seminaries ===
- Memphis School of Preaching
- Memphis Theological Seminary
- Mid-America Baptist Theological Seminary
- Harding School of Theology

== St. Jude Children's Research Hospital ==
Memphis is also home to St. Jude Children's Research Hospital, a world class medical research facility.

1996 Nobel Laureate Peter C. Doherty conducts research at this facility. There are also several other major medical teaching institutions in the city, including the University of Tennessee Health Science Center (Colleges of Medicine, Dentistry, Pharmacy and Allied Health Sciences), the Southern College of Optometry and the Baptist Memorial College of Health Sciences.

== History ==
The Memphis Training School for Nurses, progenitor of the School of Nursing, was chartered September 28, 1887.

The University of Tennessee College of Dentistry was founded in 1878 making it the oldest dental college in the South, and the third oldest public college of dentistry in the United States.

In 1963, Christian Brothers High School enrolled Jesse Turner Jr. and became the first secondary school (public or private) in the Memphis area to be racially integrated.

The Christian Brothers High School Band is the oldest high school band in America, founded in 1872.
