= Brain Music =

- Native name: ブレーン株式会社
- Industry: Music & Entertainment
- Genre: Classical
- Founded: Hiroshima, Japan (1976)
- Founder: Ken Murakami
- Headquarters: Hiroshima, Japan
- Area served: Japan,
- Products: Sheet music, CD, DVD, and Video recording, publishing and production
- Number of employees: 53 (January __, 2013)
- Subsidiaries: Bravo Music, Brain Music of Tokyo

Brain Music is music recording and publishing company, founded in 1976. It is involved in the production and distribution of music in Japan as well as global exports.

== Profile ==
Brain Music is a Japanese music recording and publishing company. It is one of the major distributors of classical music in Japan. It works with national associations such as the All-Japan Band Association to record and publish music from their competitions. Since 1999 it has been one of the few exporters of Japanese classical music through its subsidiary Bravo Music.

== History ==
Brain Co., Ltd. was founded in 1976 by Ken Murakami. It was originally a small recording company serving the Hiroshima area. It focused mainly on recording educational music groups. As demand grew, they moved into recording contests and concerts for secondary, collegiate, community, military and professional musical groups. By 1983 they had created a monthly band topics video magazine called WINDS and the area of operations for recordings expanded to cover the entirety of Japan. In 1997 they began to offer a sales and rental collection of works for wind orchestra and ensembles. Staff grew from originally two in Hiroshima to now more than 50, with branches in Tokyo and Florida. In 1999, to serve America and Europe they created a Western export division called Bravo Music.
