= Buraban =

Buraban is a Japanese term for a wind ensemble or concert band. Historically, the term is derived from the English "brass band", which is pronounced "burasubando" in Japanese. This was later shortened (using the Japanese method of abbreviation) to become simply "buraban." The term is often used to refer to school bands, which are a very popular extracurricular activity among junior high school and high school girls.

== See also ==
- Concert band
- Brass band
- All-Japan Band Association
- Education in Japan
- Secondary education in Japan
