= Music in the Parks =

American music festival

Music in the Parks is a day-long or two-day festival for student choral, orchestral, and band ensembles, held annually across the United States. Music groups perform before adjudicators who rate the ensemble in the morning, and then spend the day at an amusement park. The day culminates with an awards ceremony. Awards can be given to either a single player or a whole ensemble.

The festivals are organized by the Educational Programs Network.

== Company information ==
The program was first founded in 1981 by Dr. James R. Wells. The Educational Programs Networks hosts over 200,000 music students each year.

== Locations ==
Busch Gardens Tampa Bay Tampa, FL
Busch Gardens Williamsburg Williamsburg, VA
California's Great America Santa Clara, CA
Carowinds Charlotte, NC
Cedar Point Sandusky, OH
Darien Lake Buffalo, NY
Disneyland Resort Anaheim, CA
Dollywood Pigeon Forge, TN
Dorney Park & Wildwater Kingdom Allentown, PA
Elitch Gardens Denver, CO
Hersheypark Hershey, PA
Kennywood Pittsburgh, PA
Kings Dominion Richmond, VA
Kings Island Cincinnati, OH
Knotts Berry Farm Anaheim, CA
Lagoon Salt Lake City, UT
Lake Compounce Bristol, CT
Morey's Piers Wildwood, NJ
Oaks Park Portland, OR
Santa Cruz Beach Boardwalk Santa Cruz, CA
Sea World Orlando Orlando, FL
Sea World San Diego San Diego, CA
Silver Dollar City Branson, MO
Silverwood Coeur D'Alene, ID
Six Flags America Largo, MD
Six Flags Discovery Kingdom Vallejo, CA
Six Flags Fiesta Texas San Antonio, TX
Six Flags Great Adventure Jackson, NJ
Six Flags Great America Chicago, IL
Six Flags Magic Mountain Los Angeles, CA
Six Flags New England Agawam, MA
Six Flags Over Georgia Atlanta, GA
Six Flags Over Texas Dallas, TX
Six Flags St. Louis St. Louis, MO
Universal Orlando Orlando FL
Universal Studios Hollywood Universal City, CA
Valleyfair Minneapolis, MN
Wild Waves Theme Park Seattle, WA
Worlds of Fun Kansas City, MO

== Categories ==
There are many different categories in the Music in the Parks festival. There are categories for band, Orchestra, and choir. Each of these has a high school and junior high/middle school category. The categories are then split up into A or AA, depending on the size of the school. Also, there are different types of band, orchestra, and choir, such as concert band, jazz band, mixed choir, and women's choir. Finally, there are other awards given that are based on overall achievement or attitude, as well as for an individual member of a group.

== Awards ==
Once the group, orchestra, band and/or choir performs at the performance area, they go to the amusement park of the director's choice, and at night, they go to the location of which they are told, according to where they performed, and are given their awards at a ceremony. Students from each group are asked to represent the school or group and receive the award in honor of the school. Every school gets an award, and there are rankings (1st, 2nd, 3rd, and so on) according to how many groups entered. There are also scales on which how you performed (90 - 100% = Superior, 80 - 89.9% = Excellent, 70-79.9% = Good, 60 - 69.9% = Fair, 50 - 59% = Poor, and <50 = Participant) But even if you win 1st, you are not guaranteed Superior, and if you are placed last, you can still be Superior (since that is based on the performance score).
