= Toshio Mashima =

Japanese composer

Toshio Mashima (真島 俊夫, Mashima Toshio) (21 February 1949 – 21 April 2016) was a Japanese composer born in Yamagata Prefecture, Japan.

== Biography ==
First, he studied engineering. He interrupted this to study music. He graduated from the Kanagawa University and took the Yamaha Band Director course, going on to do his major in technology. He also studied music composition under Bin Kanade and jazz theory under Makoto Uchibori. He graduated in 1971 and went on to play trombone in jazz and pop bands. He then worked as an assistant to Naohiro Iwai and began to focus on making compositions for bands.

His own works, especially for bands, are published in Europe and sold in America. Lately, he has also composed for TV series and movies. He served as an instructor of the Institute of Education, Sobi, as well as working as a special instructor at the Yamaha Music School.

He won an award in the composition section of the 7th Academic Society of Japan for Winds and Percussion bands competition.

Mashima died at the age of 67, due to cancer, on 21 April 2016.

== Works ==
=== Work for Wind ===
- 1985 View with a Glimpes of Waves
- 1986 Takarajima Show Samba
- 1992 A Prelude to Applause
- 1992 Dream in the Silent Night
- 1997 Mirage à Paris
  1. St. Germain des Pres
  2. La Fontaine de Medicis (Jardin du Luxembourg)
  3. Montmartre Place du Tertre-Sacre Coeur
- 1997 Jacob's Ladder To a Crescent
- 1997 Sousa's Holiday-The Thunderer - Samba (arr.)
- 1997 Sousa's Holiday-The Stars and Stripes Forever - Jazz (arr.)
- 1998 Yosakoi
- 1999 The Glowing Sun Appeared on the Horizon
- 1999 A Tribute to the Count Basie Orchestra
- 1999 Twilight in Central Park Ballad
- 2000 Les Gens du Nord
- 2000 Iroha
  1. Theme Largo
  2. 1st Variation Allegro
  3. 2nd Variation Adagio
  4. 3rd Variation and Finale Presto
- 2000–2001 Les trois notes du Japon
  1. La danse des grues (Tanz der Kraniche)
  2. La rivière enneigée (Der Fluß im Schnee)
  3. La fête du feu (Feuerfest)
- 2000 March Spirit for Wind Orchestra
- 2001 Quiet Sunset
- 2001 At The Mambo Inn
- 2001 Welcome Rock Melody
- 2003 Mirage III
  1. Tune Up
  2. Something Blue
  3. After Hour
- 2003 Naval Bleu
- 2004 Deux Belles Ailes
- 2009 Birds
  1. Swallow
  2. Seagull
  3. Phoenix
- A Rainbow over Misty Mountain
- A Season in the Bloom of Cherry Blossoms
  1. Jumpin' at the Woodside
  2. April in Paris (1932)
  3. Lil' Darlin (195
- Anohi-kiita-uta Folk Medley
- Bay Breeze
- Carpenters Forever
- Five Okinawa Songs for Band
- 2001 Gelato con Caffee Samba
- 2014 Mount Fuji: La musique inspirée de l'estampe de Hokusai
- Sweet Breeze in May Concert-March

=== Chamber music ===
- 1995 Urban Suite
  1. Twilight
  2. Station
  3. Day Dream
  4. City Light
- 2000 Spinning Spiral for four Trombones
  1. Allegro
  2. Adagio
  3. Allegro maestoso
- 2004 Conversation IV for two Snare Drums, four Tom-toms, Bass Drum, four Timpanis, Cymbals, Suspended Cymbal, Tam-tam, Castanets, two Wood Blocks, five Temple Blocks, Bongo, Triangle, Wind Chimes, Cabasa, Crotales(Opt.), Glockenspiel, Xylophone, Vibraphone, Marimba, Chimes
- 2004 La Seine for Clarinet-Choir
  1. Pont Neuf
  2. Pont Mirabeau
  3. Pont Alexandre III
- A Spring Morning for Euphonium
- Rhapsody for Euphonium
- Cafe St Germain for Saxophone-Quartet

=== Work for Big Band/Jazz-Ensemble ===
- Cat Race
- Morning Mist
- Pacific Coast Highway
- Samba nautica
