= Carnival Memphis =

Coordinates: 35.11144°N 89.90409°W

Carnival Memphis (formerly known as the Memphis Cotton Carnival) is a series of parties and festivals staged annually since 1931 in Memphis, Tennessee, by the centralized Carnival Memphis Association and its member krewes (similar to that of Mardi Gras) during the month of June. Carnival salutes various aspects of Memphis and its industries, and is reigned over by current year's secretly selected King, Queen, and Royal Court of Carnival.

== Royalty ==
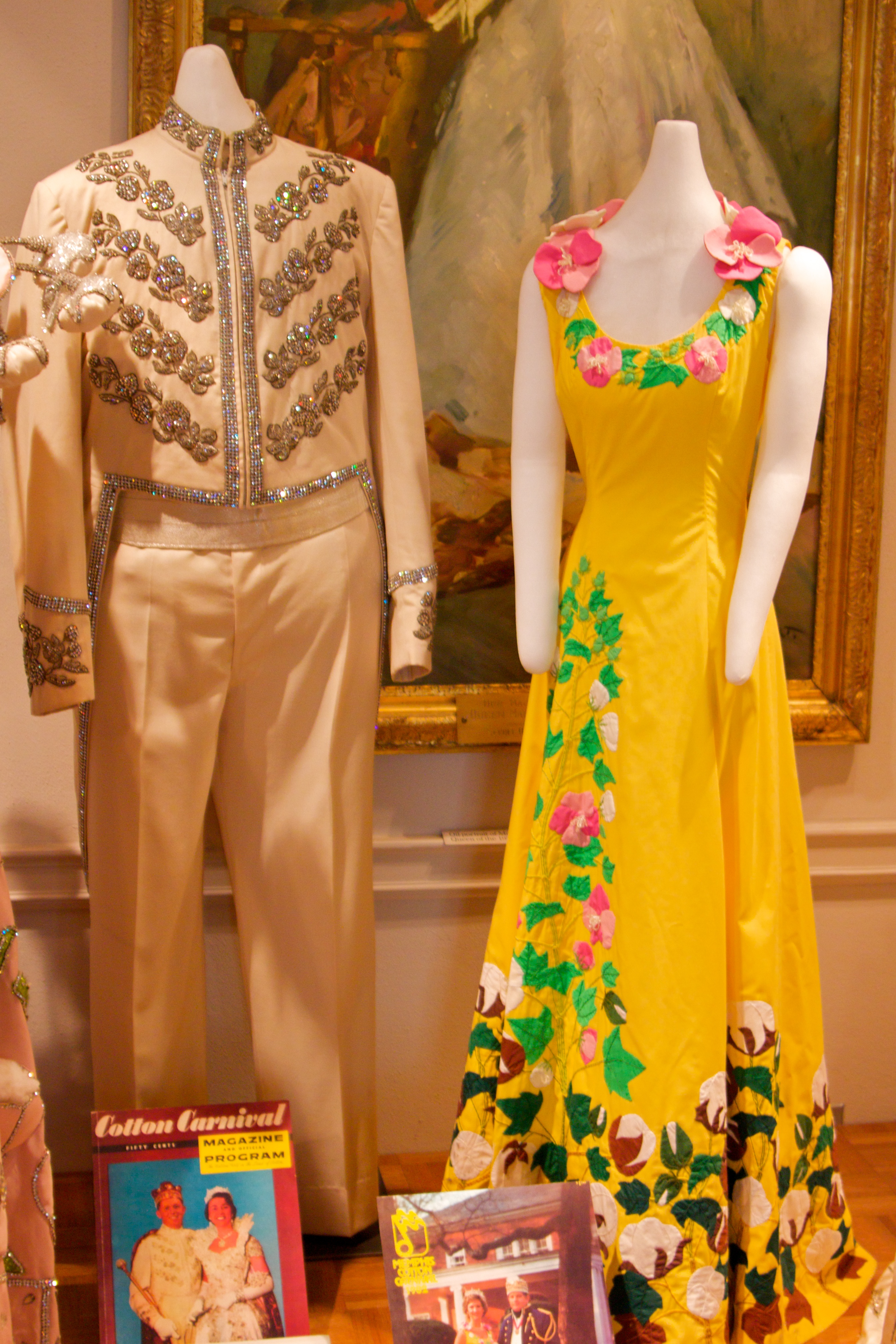
Memphis Cotton Carnival exhibit at the Pink Palace Museum

The Royal Court is made up of young women from Memphis (princesses), mostly around the age of nineteen, typically having completed their first-year of study in college, and their escorts. Members of the Court not from the city of Memphis are known as "Ladies of the Realm." Members of the Court sometimes carry special titles such as the "King's Princess," in which she is selected by the King himself to bear this title, as is a "Queen's Princess," a "President's Princess", and princesses representing various social clubs in Memphis, such as the "Princess of the Memphis Country Club" or the various krewes within Carnival. The male escort of the princess representing the various social clubs normally bears the masculine form of the title as well, making one in this instance be the "Prince of the University Club." The Queen is a young woman who is at least a few years older than the court, typically being the age one would be having finished two to three years in college. The King is traditionally much older than the court, and is a prominent leader from the current year's saluted industry. "Carnival" is usually held during the first week of June, commencing the Friday after Memorial Day, beginning with the Crown & Sceptre Ball and ending with the Grand Carnival Ball. During this time the Grand Krewes of Carnival also hold their own events and parties celebrating their King, Queen and Court, along with the entire revelers of Carnival Memphis.

== Governance and Krewe system ==
Carnival Memphis is put on by the Carnival Memphis Association, which is governed by a Board of Directors, (vacancies are filled by the other members of the Board), a President (elected annually by the board members), and an executive director, who manages the daily aspects of the association.

The Carnival Memphis Association organizes, plans, budgets, and promotes the King, Queen, and Royal Court, as well as many of the events staged during Carnival week. However, the Grand Krewes (once known as secret societies) also stage their own festivities throughout the year, elect their own royalty, manage their own budget, and have their own membership requirements. Most of these organizations bear Egyptian names in accordance to tradition originally set out by the Mystic Memphi, and in conjunction with Memphis being the sister city of ancient Memphis, Egypt. The twelve Grand Krewes that Carnival Memphis recognizes are the Mystic Society of the Memphi, Osiris, Sphinx, RaMet, Ennead, Phoenix, Aani, Ptolemy, Kemet Jubilee, Ptah, Luxor, Queen Bees. The Secret Order of the Boll Weevils is a support group of Carnival that is not a Grand Krewe. The Grand Krewes of Memphi, Osiris, RaMet and Sphinx are "old-line" Grand Krewes and were all started in the 1930s as the original secret societies of the Memphis Cotton Carnival. However, Memphi considers its history traceable to the 1870s as the original promoters of the Memphis Mardi Gras, although it became defunct during the time that span between the last Mardi Gras and its restoration as a Cotton Carnival secret society. Membership requirements and financial commitments are normally more complex when one wishes to join one of the older krewes, as compared to the newer krewes, that may have little or no membership process. Memphi and Osiris are all-male organizations, with some exceptions. Memphi allows their past queens to become members after their reign, following their belief that "once a Queen, always a Queen!."

Each Grand Krewe is independently governed by a Board of Directors, and elects its own executive from within its membership. The title of the executives differ from krewe to krewe, mostly known as "General Chairman," or "Chairman". The King and Queen of Carnival Memphis are kept secret until an announcement usually in early February. A few of the old-line Grand Krewes keep their royalty a secret throughout most, if not all of Carnival. The Sublime Ouro (the King) of Memphi is not announced until the Wednesday night of Carnival Week to his own krewe members. The King of Osiris is announced on the last day of Carnival Week.

== History ==
=== Mardi Gras era ===
In the 1870s, Memphis was looking to regain its economic vitality and prosperity. Along with much of the South and the nation as a whole, Memphis was suffering from the devastation of the Civil War and Reconstruction. In 1872, the city of Memphis celebrated Mardi Gras, keeping with the traditional Christian liturgical calendar just before the season of Lent, similar to what was practiced in New Orleans, Louisiana, and other cities. The celebration was the brainchild of local businessmen such as David P. Hadden and former Confederate soldier Colton Greene, who in 1871 proposed the idea in response to the Memphis Daily Appeal's call for ideas and plans to boost the city's economy and business community. The celebration rivaled those of New Orleans. Greene—best remembered as the founder of the Memphis Mardi Gras—also founded the Mystic Society of Memphi that funded and organized the social events of the carnival. With the help of Hadden and others, “Greene persuaded railroad companies to lower fares during the celebrations, hired fashionable artists and costumers and succeeded in attracting huge crowds for the grand parades.” Over the course of the years, more secret societies, or “krewe” systems formed and were instrumental in planning and staging the big parade and elaborate balls and parties to celebrate and serve as the face of the festive season.

The carnival featured colorful costumes, inspired by the cultures of classical antiquity: Greece, Rome, and Egypt. Playing on the Egyptian roots of its name, Memphis artists and designers used imagery in floats, invitations, and flyers to give the party a mystical feeling. The festival had its own inventive origin story, created by artists such as Memphis artist Carl Gutherz. Gutherz was commissioned to create elaborate invitations to society parties and balls, which created interest and envy. Sketches of floats and events by Gutherz appeared in national magazines and publications and were essential the success of Memphis Mardi Gras. A Memphis Daily Appeal account of the first Memphis Mardi Gras estimated 20,000 people attended in a city of slightly more than 40,000.

The 1872 Memphis Mardi Gras featured a Ku Klux Klan float. This float, as reported in the Memphis Daily Appeal and the pro-Klan Memphis Avalanche, was the Klan's response to Northern Whites who thought of the Klan as a violently racist organization. The Memphis Avalanche's description of the float:

Those mythical terrors to negroes, the Ku-Klux were well represented... In every instance they were in black, with high hats of a conical shape. Each hat bore the skull and cross bones and the terrible letters K. K. K. in white. As they marched along, the Negroes [moved] back. Many of the K. K.s had rope lassos, and it was a favorite bit of pleasantry to lasso a Negro. No violence was offered, but the contortions and grimaces of the captives were highly amusing.

Historian Elaine Parsons says the float was intended to ridicule the newspapers that reported outrages by the Klan. An article excerpt from the Memphis Daily Appeal notes a white man on the float impersonating a “spade,” a derogatory term for African Americans. The float, occurring a mere six years after the 1866 Memphis Massacre, re-emphasized that the celebrations were for White citizens only.

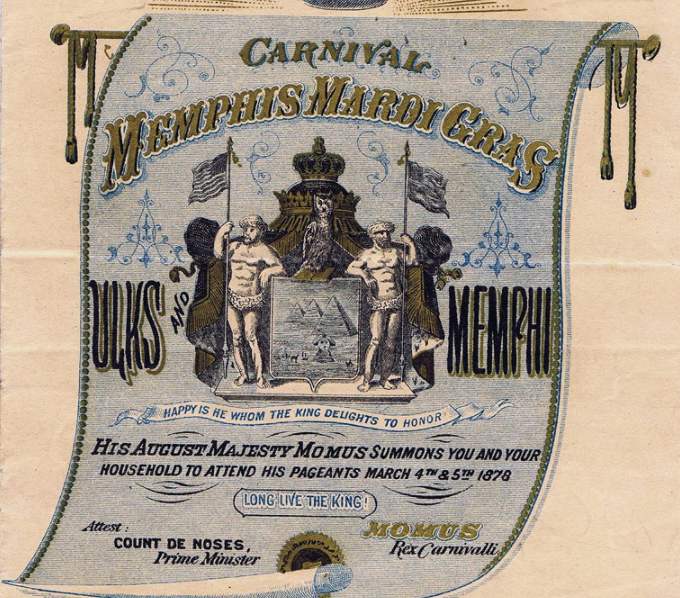
1878 Memphis Mardi Gras invitation to pageants occurring on March 3, 1878, and March 4, 1878.

Though the celebration of Memphis Mardi Gras saw great success, the massive Yellow Fever outbreak and the decline of the city in the 1880s cause the gradual decline of Mardi Gras. By roughly the turn of the century, the party was over. The legacy lived on in other Memphis events with a revival during the Great Depression. Mardi Gras was reincarnated in 1931 as the Cotton Carnival, and the new celebration became one of the biggest parties of the South, remaining a culturally significant event that Memphis celebrates to this day.

=== Memphis Cotton Carnival ===
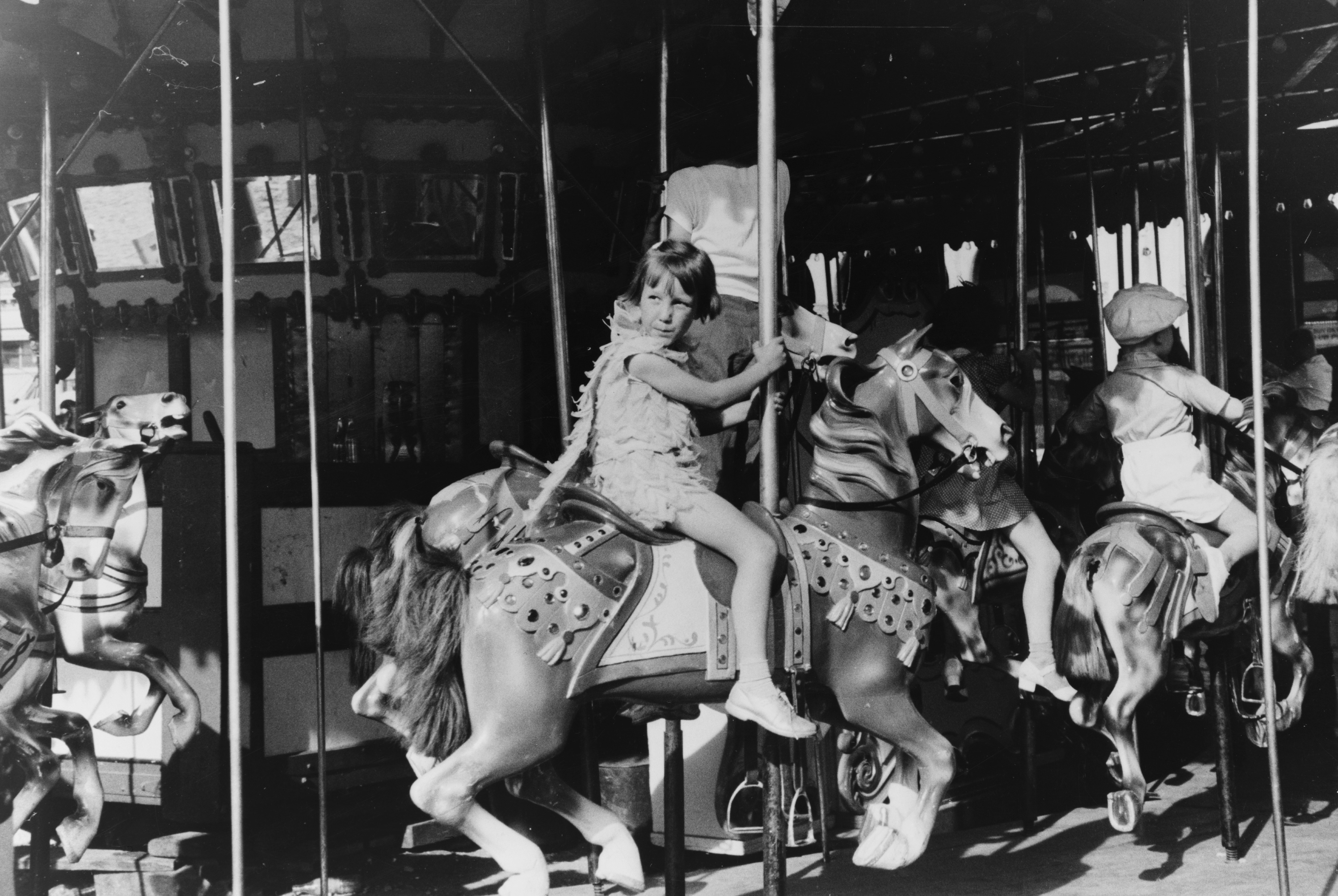
A carousel at the Memphis Cotton Carnival, 1940

During the early twentieth century, great interest developed in creating a citywide event like Carnival, and re-establishing the Mystic Memphi. As more influential Memphians became actively interested, Memphi and the Memphis Cotton Carnival Association were established in the early 1930s. The efforts were conducted to bring a sense of excitement and life back to the city of Memphis and its people. However, rather than following the Lenten calendar and being held strictly to celebrate Mardi Gras, designers decided that this festival would promote Memphis' primary asset at the time-cotton. During this time, Memphis and the Mid-South region, like the rest of the United States, were in the throes of the Great Depression. Many were out of work and the region's cotton was selling for pennies a pound. The prosperity of the Mid-South was dependent on cotton and measures had to be taken to increase the use of this precious commodity. At the same time, the Memphis Chamber of Commerce was having trouble raising money to compete with other cities in the South, such as Atlanta and New Orleans. A. Arthur Halle and a group of businessmen called on Herbert Jennings, a downtown theatre manager for a donation. Jennings agreed to contribute and shared an idea that he believed would help promote business and draw attention to cotton. To help publicize an upcoming movie, Jennings offered local retailers the opportunity to display cotton goods in his theatre and planned to encourage them to use their own store windows to promote cotton clothing. Halle was intrigued by the idea and envisioned a larger citywide promotion and called upon Everett R. Cook, who was President of the Memphis Cotton Exchange at this time. Cook was invited to come to the theatre to hear the ideas. Those ideas quickly grew into a plan for a grand celebration with a King, Queen and Royal Court that would involve people from all over the Mid-South. The idea was to promote the use and wearing of cotton products which would lead to increased demand and stimulate sales. The plan was successful, as people began to demand more cotton products from socks to ball gowns.

Cook expressed his vision this way: "Carnival is to promote business for everybody and should not be used by any one group. It is for all of the stores and all of the people, for all kinds of professions and businesses, for the city as a whole regardless of the size of the business, the social standing, wealth, prestige, family background or anything else that would tend to make anyone feel that he or she would not be invited to participate in Carnival."

The fanfare and excitement that centered around the Cotton Carnival climaxed throughout the mid-to-late twentieth century. During this time, the event stretched several weeks during the months of May and June, and had incorporated much more than it had originally set out to do. The Memphis Cotton Carnival Association had become a very centralized governing body, which along with the participating krewes, was becoming a festival that could not be rivaled anywhere in the South except New Orleans' Mardi Gras (in which it brought in as many numbers). While the series of street parades in downtown Memphis continued to be held, in addition to the numerous parties at many of the city's most elite social clubs continued, the event started to form a new face of entertainment that dubbed it the "South's Greatest Party" for all to enjoy. The Carnival and its krewes held on to the traditional aspects of Carnival, but entertained onlookers with such musicians as Elvis Presley, Waylon Jennings, and Jerry Lee Lewis, welcoming guests from all over the United States, and from all over the world. By this time it had truly become the city's most important and celebrated event, participated by Memphians and Mid-Southerners from all socioeconomic backgrounds. In addition to the Music Festival, its most intriguing and popular event was the Arrival of the Royal Barge. This event was very much a "sight to see" in which the King, Queen, and Royal Court, along with the royal pages, guards, and other participants would all ride in on a beautifully decorated barge on the Mississippi River, docking in downtown Memphis for all onlookers to revel and awe over. With elaborately designed and well-lit backdrops, along with the night sky being lit up with an array of fireworks, this was truly a wonder for everyone present. The entire city, it seemed, gathered along the Mississippi riverbanks on a spring evening to attend the Royal Barge Landing, walk along the Carnival midway, and watch the Carnival parade. Many national publications and media covered the fanfare, and the Association even crowned a Maid of Cotton to tour the globe and promote cotton fashions.

=== Decline ===
The assassination of Martin Luther King Jr. left Memphis devastated in many different ways, one aspect being the state of its downtown. As urban sprawl began to be more and more common, with businesses and residents moving away from the city's inner core, the public events that were once staged by the Cotton Carnival became few and far between. Parades slowly became a thing of the past, as did the arrival of the Royal Barge. The city of Memphis municipal government acquired the "float factory" once used to manufacture the elaborately decorated floats, and mainstream Memphians and Mid-Southerners slowly became less interested in staging this event. Also, other festivals began to form that took the place of Carnival, such as the Memphis in May International Festival, and its highly anticipated Beale Street Music Festival.

Over the years, however, Carnival's luster began to fade along with the declining role of cotton in the area. The national press gradually lost interest, and the Maid of Cotton Pageant was moved to Dallas, Texas, where it exists today. For various reasons, the 1980s saw the name of the Cotton Carnival be changed to the Great River Carnival, and because of even less approval changed again to Carnival Memphis. The organization sited this was done because the community had grown in such tremendous ways, and that the Memphis economy had become more diversified and no longer centered exclusively around cotton. The king was beginning to be chosen from leaders in other aspects of commerce other than the cotton industry, and was no longer referred to as "King Cotton," but as King, or Rex Carnivali.

For years, the Cotton Carnival was, though not officially, for all intents and purposes for white people only. When a Beale Street dentist named Dr. R.Q. Venson took his nephew downtown to see a Carnival parade in 1934, complete with the marching bands and floats (which were for a few years in its existence pulled by black men), and asked him if he enjoyed it. He didn't, his nephew replied, because "all the negroes were horses." Venson enjoined other black Memphians to hold their own separate event. As a result, the Cotton Makers' Fiesta was organized in 1934. The name changed to Cotton Makers' Jubilee and, as a protest to establish dignity and respect for Negro men and women, the first celebration was held the third week of May 1936. The Jubilee enjoyed its most successful years from 1948 to 1958. There were only two occasions in the celebrations past when no activities took place. The first such time was during World War II and the second occasion in 1968 due to the assassination of Dr. Martin Luther King Jr. The organization briefly merged with Carnival Memphis in 1982 when it became known as the krewe Kemet Jubilee.

The King was, and still is, an older man who had ties with the industry being saluted that year, while the Queen was, and still is, a young, unmarried woman from one of Memphis' "better" families.

The elitist charge came about from all the supposedly secret activities of the Carnival royalty and especially the various Grand Krewes, whose membership — and parties, especially — were by invitation only. Year after year, many outsiders would read The Commercial Appeal (Memphis newspaper) stories of fancy-dress balls and dinners and dances held by mysterious-sounding, Egyptian-themed Krewes, and wonder, why they could not attend those parties or have their daughters debut in these certain circles; this sense of separation within the Memphis community led to charges of elitism.

== Carnival Memphis today ==
By the later twentieth century Carnival Memphis had the general reputation of having dwindled down to nothing but a series of formal debutante parties at the various private social and country clubs, consisting largely of the city's elite gathering together to promote an event that "was once, but no longer", and it was truly living out its twilight years. Gone were the parades, the grand parties, the fireworks, the midway, and the hustle and bustle of an entire metropolitan area to promote itself and to gather together to take part in such a great event.

However, as Carnival officials grew more and more aware about certain negative issues surrounding the event and its severely declining reputation, they began actually implementing steps over the years to bring outsiders into their realm. More and more Carnival events are now open to the public. African-American Memphians are beginning to take part, and Carnival had one black Krewe, Cotton Makers' (currently Kemet) Jubilee, from 1982 to 2007. Also, Carnival has begun selecting local charities and organizing special events just for Carnival krewes, with each charity receiving a monetary donation.

Seventy-four years later, the mission of Carnival remains much the same as it was in 1931-to recognize and promote an industry that has a major economic impact on the Mid-South community, and to promote the City of Memphis as a great place to live and work, and to cause an annual celebration in honor of that industry and the people of the Mid-South. The general motto of Carnival Memphis is "Convivium Cum Propositione," Latin for "The Party with a Purpose!". According to Jim Cole, who lived in Memphis from the mid-1950s to the early 1960s and attended numerous Cotton Carnivals, "Elvis Presley was a major headline entertainer during the mid 1950s".

Despite the efforts of many prominent Memphians, many Carnival Krewes have ceased operations in recent years.
