= School bands in Singapore =

School Bands in Singapore is one of the co-curricular activities (CCA) that can be found in primary schools, secondary schools, and junior colleges in Singapore. As an extracurricular activity, They form an integral part of the students’ holistic education that are aimed at nurturing student qualities and preparing them to adapt and thrive in a rapidly changing world. As with other CCAs, the programmes in Singapore school bands follow the Ministry of Education (MOE)’s CCAs guiding principles of building team spirit and responsibility, being broad-based with opportunities to specialise, being responsive to inculcating national values and skills, as well as promoting social integration.

Generally, there are no admission criteria into primary and secondary school bands, although junior college bands may prefer experienced players. The average size of school bands is around 60 members while some bands may go up to 100 to 160 members.

== General information ==
=== Activities programme ===
School bands commonly attend ceremonial events within the school, and participate in public performances outside the school, for the purpose of providing music to supplement different occasions. In addition, school bands also participate in competitions at both local and international music festivals. As students undergo the process of rehearsing in the band, either for foot drills or music drills, the disciplined routines allow them to learn the values of discipline, teamwork, responsibility and commitment. As they participate in competitions, students also learn to celebrate their achievements while maintaining humility or even to accept defeat in good grace. These are experiences that members of the school bands gain through the programme.

The Singapore Youth Orchestra (SYO), managed by the MOE, accepts students from school bands and recognized it officially as an extra-curricular activity for students who are members. Professionally trained musicians (from the Singapore Symphony Orchestra, and graduates of music conservatories) give one-on-one fully subsidized coaching for most of the student musicians.

The musical standard that Singapore school bands have reached today can be exemplified in the recognised international competitions and events that some school bands have been invited to participate in. One example would be the Sydney Olympic Games Opening Ceremony held in Australia in 2000, when six school band members were selected to participate in the international band display item.

=== Professional association ===
School bands in Singapore are coordinated by the professional association, the Band Directors’ Association (Singapore) (BDAS). The first School Band Directors Convention was held on 29 August 1990, and subsequently in the years 1995, 2001, and 2004. The BDAS lays out a set of objectives for the band directors, primary for the purpose of developing and improving the band programme, curriculum, supervision and instruction.

== History ==
In 1965, the Ministry of Education first launched the Band Project as part of the Extra-Curriculum Activity Programme (ECA) (renamed as Co-Curriculum Activity or CCA in 1999) in both Primary and Secondary Schools. It was aided by the directive given by Prime Minister Lee Kuan Yew, who instructed that the formation of school bands should be considered a "high priority". At its beginning, the project began with only 4 brass bands in aided secondary schools, and 9 Bugle and Fife bands in Primary Schools that were mainly functioning under the banners of the Boys’ Brigade and Boy Scouts. Within six years, the number of school bands rapidly increased to 77 brass bands in secondary schools and 78 Bugle and Fife bands in primary schools in 1971. As of the year 2000, 44 primary schools, 132 secondary schools and 14 junior colleges have their own school bands, and in that year, 12,000 students were in the band movement. This number translated to around 27.5% of students taking part in the CCA music in the year 2000 being in the bands. Thus, the school band movement has been evolving since its inception in 1965, with an increase in both the number and quality of school bands over the years.

The government then started school bands with the original purpose of developing group discipline, esprit de corps and a sense of national identity among the students who joined the band as their ECA. Schools bands would also contribute to school spirit and enhance the school programme on ceremonial occasions. In addition, the government took the general musical poverty of most citizens in the 1960s into account, and wanted to establish school bands so as to give schooling children a start in musical interest.

Challenges faced in the early beginnings of the Band Project included the shortage of band instructors and teachers for the school bands. Such challenges were overcome with in-service training and scholarships to encourage those who were interested to go into music teaching.

Despite the challenges, in 1990, 25 years after the Band Project in Singapore was launched, the ECA centre estimated that about 20,000 students would have once been members of school bands, and would have benefited from the school band movement.

== Singapore Youth Festival ==
The Singapore Youth Festival (SYF) was first launched in 1966. The opening ceremony was held at the Jalan Besar Stadium in 1967. Initial activities in the early festivals only included music and dance, but it gradually extended to field sports, art forms, and later, mass displays.

The SYF Central Judging was later introduced in 1968. It continues to be an annual event during which most schools' performing arts groups compete at their respective levels. In 1968, three years shortly after the Band Project was launched, school bands started to compete at the SYF Central Judging. The CCA Branch of the Ministry of Education organises the Central Judging of Concert Bands (Primary Schools, Secondary Schools and Junior Colleges), Central Judging of Display Bands (Secondary Schools) and the Assessment of Marching Bands (Secondary Schools) in alternate years. The involvement of school bands in the annual SYF is evident, as 117 secondary school bands and 14 junior college bands with 7,709 participants were involved in the SYF Central Judging of Concert Bands in 2001.
