= The Christian Brothers Band (Memphis) =

American high-school band from Tennessee

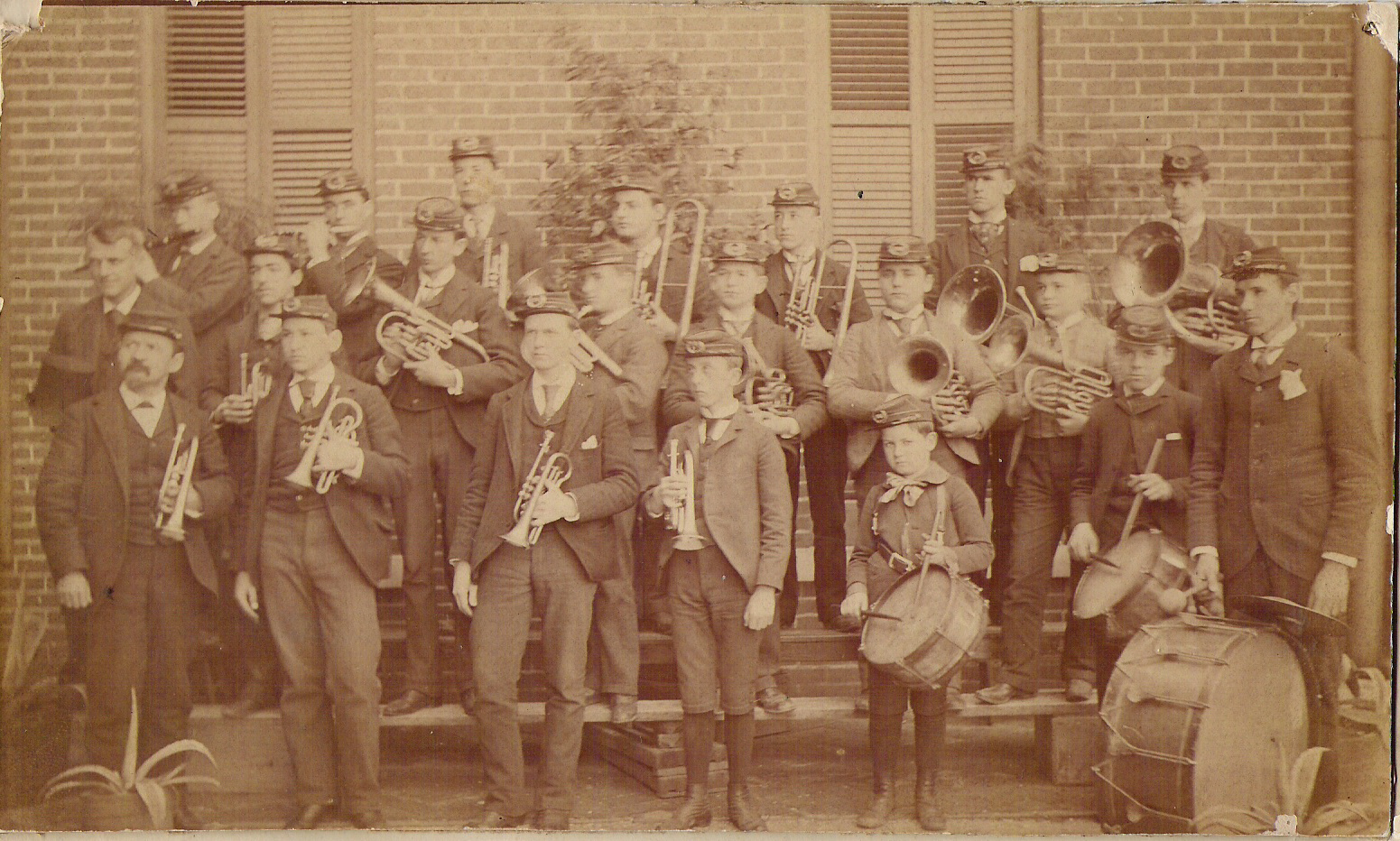
1888 Christian Brothers Band under the direction of Paul Schneider with Br. Maurelian

The Christian Brothers Band of Christian Brothers High School (Memphis, Tennessee) is the oldest high school band in America, having a continuous existence since its founding in 1872. The band was founded in the fall of 1872 by Br. Maurelian, who served as the first band director. The first recorded performance of the group was in the Memphis St. Patrick's Day Parade of 1873, and the band has performed every year since. The band has an unbroken lineage of ten band directors.

== Under the direction of Brother Maurelian (1872-1882) ==
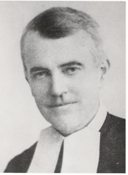
Br. Maurelian c1882

Br. Maurelian (George Valin Sheel), a LaSallian Christian Brother, founder and president of Christian Brothers College (later known as Christian Brothers University (Memphis, Tennessee) and Christian Brothers High School (Memphis, Tennessee)) began the band and orchestra in 1872 and served as the first band director from 1872-82. Under his direction the band performed in its first performance on record in 1873 at the Memphis St. Patrick's Day Parade performing "The Wearing of the Green." Maurelian directed the band at public examinations, commencement ceremonies, parades, and through two epidemics of yellow fever that crippled the city of Memphis. On May 27, 1876 the band performed at the dedication of the Memphis Court Square Fountain closing the program with "Home, Sweet Home."

== Under the direction of Professor Paul Schneider Sr. (1882-1892) ==
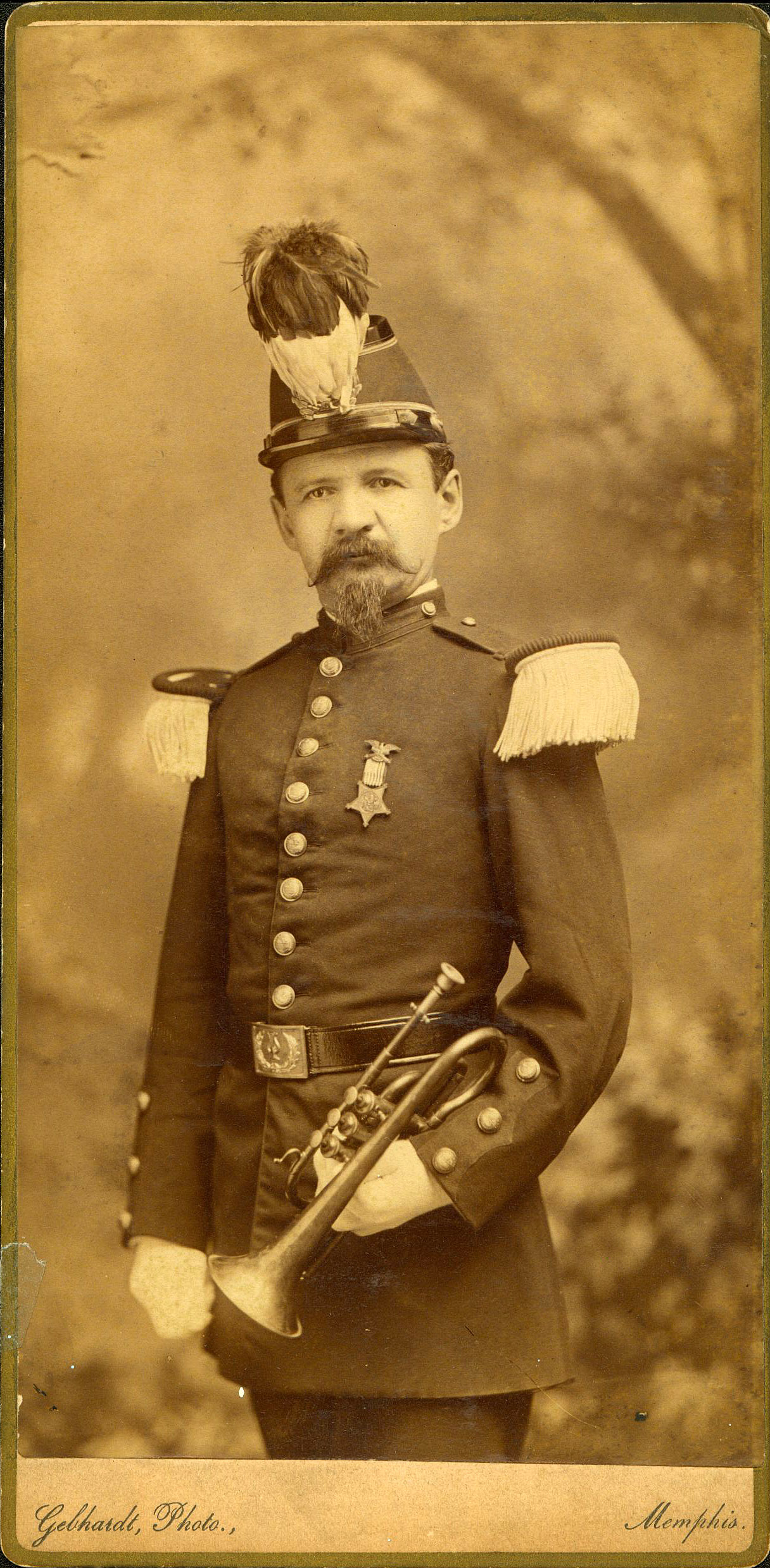
Prof. Paul Schneider

Professor Paul Schneider was a bugler in the Union Army and played violin in many touring orchestras after the Civil War including performing in Ford's Theatre the night that President Abraham Lincoln was assassinated. He directed the Christian Brothers Band from 1882 until 1892. The band under his direction performed at commencement ceremonies and parades. On October 14, 1887 the band performed for President Grover Cleveland on his visit to Memphis, and on May 12, 1892 the band performed on the "Kate Adams" steamboat for the dedication of the Great Mississippi River Bridge, the first bridge to cross the Mississippi from St. Louis to New Orleans.

While directing the band and orchestra, Schneider wrote a series of march books for the band that include Quicksteps, Schottisches, Waltzs, Polkas and Irish tunes.

== Under the direction of Professor William Wallace Saxby, Jr. (1892-1916) ==
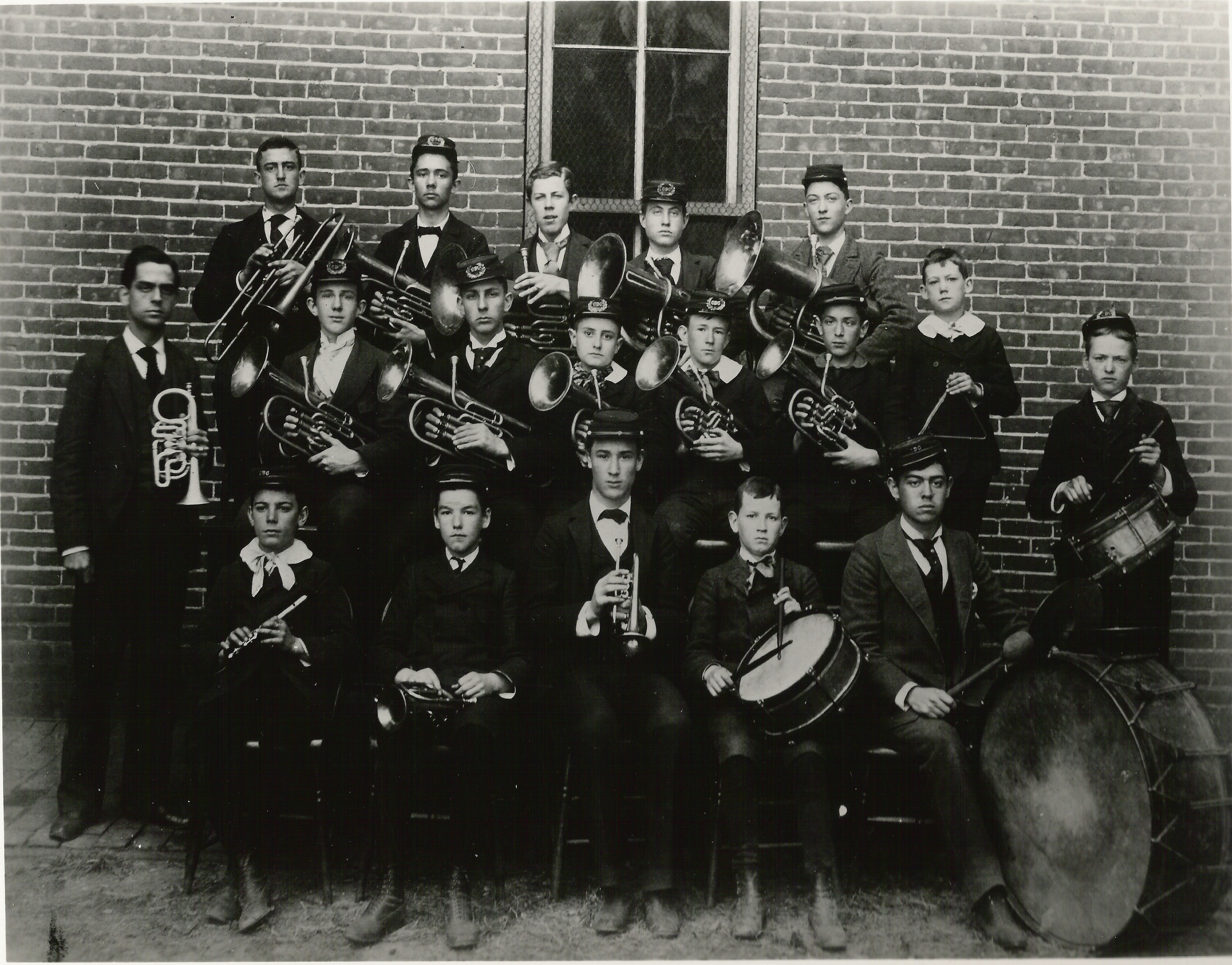
The Christian Brothers Band c1890 under the direction of W.W. Saxby, Jr.

William Wallace Saxby was a graduate of Christian Brothers College of Memphis and a student of Paul Schneider. After graduation he went to New York and Chicago to study violin and returned to teach at Christian Brothers at the age of nineteen.

During his time as band and orchestra director from 1892 to 1916, he organized the Memphis Philharmonic Orchestra Association and was instrumental, along with Paul Schneider, in the reorganization of the Memphis Federation of Musicians. Saxby later became the band director of the Memphis Municipal Park Band. Under the direction of Prof. Saxby, the band performed for parades and commencements, along with Christmas entertainment. On May 6, 1900 the band performed in a parade honoring Admiral George Dewey, hero of the Spanish–American War.

== Under the direction of Joseph Henkel, Jr. (1916-1923) ==
In 1916, Joseph Henkel, Jr. joined the faculty as band director during World War I. He studied violin in Germany, a pupil of Joseph Joachim. He had the distinction of playing under such celebrated conductors as Richard Strauss, Siegfried Wagner, Oscar Fried, and Joseph Stransky. In Memphis he worked for the Memphis College of Music and was director of the Memphis Symphony Orchestra. During this time the band took part in the Memphis Preparedness Parade on June 3, 1916 and performed on Armistice Day in Court Square and for the dedication of Sacred Heart Church both in 1922.

== Under the direction of Frank J. Steuterman, Sr.(1923-1931) ==
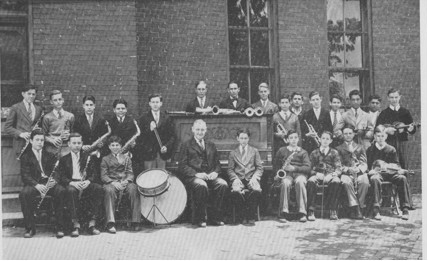
The Christian Brothers Band in 1929 under the direction of Frank Steuterman

Frank Steuterman came to Memphis with his family where he was a professional harpist with the St. Louis Symphony. He was strongly tied to the Memphis Musicians' Union, was a very active musician in Memphis, and ran a school of music from his house. Many famous musicians could be found at his home including W. C. Handy. He served as band director at Christian Brothers from 1923 until 1931. By the time of Steuterman's direction, the band had changed from a band that resembled a Local Town Band to a Jazz Orchestra style band, performing at dinners, college plays, and the first accounts of the band performing for the football team.

== Under the direction of Captain Charles Harrison (1931-1941) ==
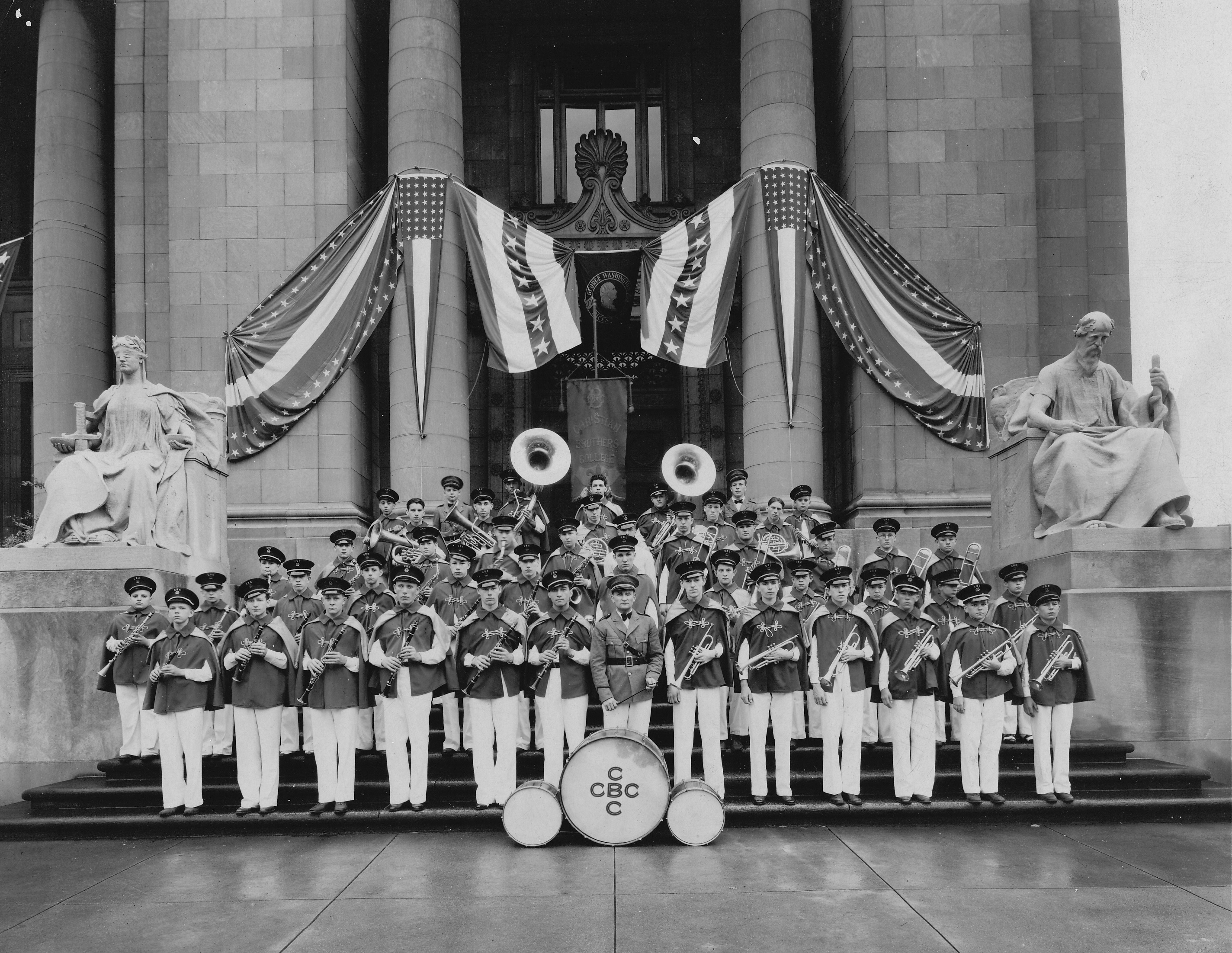
The Christian Brothers Band in 1932 under the direction of Capt. Charles Harrison

In 1931 the band was reorganized by Captain Charles Harrison into a modern day school band. The band received new instruments and uniforms. Thanks to the Melody Music Shop and the Cotton Carnival, the school band movement blossomed in Memphis, and most of the city's bands were founded during this time. Harrison became the band director of several bands throughout the city and held summer band camps at the fairgrounds.

The Christian Brothers Band began to be known as the official band of the Cotton Carnival, marching in the parade every year. On June 9, 1940, the band performed at the dedication of the new Christian Brothers College Campus at 650 East Parkway.

== Under the direction of Brother Joseph Raphael (1941-1947) ==
Brother Joseph Raphael (Edmund Jack Humphrey) came to the campus in 1941 and was the band director until 1947. Under his direction, the band began to perform halftime shows for the football team. A dance band was also formed. It was during this time that the school fight song was selected (Aggie War Hymn), the purple wave mascot was adopted, and the colors of purple and gold were officially made the school colors. A dance band and glee club were also started on the campus to accompany the largest concerts the school performed known as the "Cotton Capers." The band performed yearly for the graduation ceremonies and started to perform at Concert Festivals.

== Under the direction of Doctor Ralph Hale (1947-1983) ==
Ralph Hale arrived on the campus in 1947 and served as band director until 1983 (with Mike Krepper from 1980 until 1983). Under the baton of Ralph Hale, the band became notable on a national level. The band performed for the Midwest Clinic, the dedication of St. Jude Children's Research Hospital, and for President Richard Nixon and Spiro Agnew. The band received superior ratings at concert festival every year of his direction. In 1973 the band celebrated its 100th anniversary and was ranked in the top 100 bands in America. Ralph Hale was a composer of music for young bands with his brother Jack Hale.

== Under the direction of Gabriel Michael Krepper (1980-2000) ==
Gabriel Michael "Mike" Krepper was conductor the Christian Brothers Band from 1980 until 2000. Under his direction the band received superior ratings at concert festival, and began to record their concerts on Compact Disc. In 1995 the band was featured at the Tennessee Band Masters Meeting held at TMEA All-State festival. Krepper was also instrumental in developing the schools Jazz Band program and began the Historic Band Program, a band that replicates the first bands at Christian Brothers in attire and instrumentation.

== Under the direction of Patrick Bolton (2000-present) ==
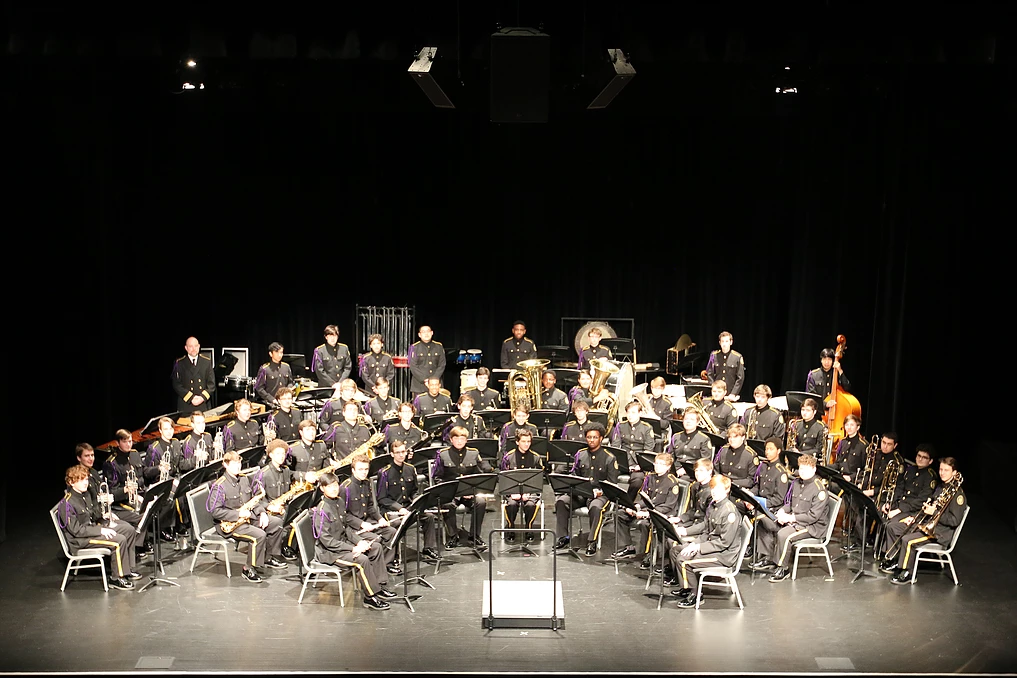
The 2017 Christian Brothers Gold Band at their spring concert at the Halloran Center in downtown Memphis

Patrick Bolton was a student of the band program under the direction of Mike Krepper. In 1995 he graduated and was recipient of the Ralph Hale Band Award. His first year of teaching was in 2000, and under his direction the band has performed in Carnegie Hall, the Lincoln Center, the Kennedy Center, and in front of the Lincoln Memorial. The band has also performed in concert festivals from Hawaii to Atlanta, having performed in twenty-one US States and Washington D.C. In 2010 the band recorded at The Stax Music Academy (located on the campus of the legendary record label) STAX. The band performed their 140th Anniversary concert at the Orpheum Theatre in Memphis. In 2017 the band toured North and South Carolina, the last two states needed to have played in every state South of the Mason-Dixon line. The band achieved superior ratings at Concert Festival in 2015, 2017, and 2018, and the band also took first place at the 2017 Southern Heritage National Concert Festival in Charleston, South Carolina. In 2019 the band toured to Alaska and the West Coast with performances in Juneau, the Tracy Arm Fjord, Portland, and Seattle.

Starting in 2022 the band began its 150th Jubilee celebration with a tour to Washington D.C., Lancaster, Philadelphia, Camden, Wilmington, and Baltimore that followed in Br. Maurelian's footsteps as an early Brother in the area. In 2023, the band paraded in the Memphis St. Patrick's Day Parade, commemorating the 150th anniversary of the band's first public performance in 1873 and performed at the Cannon Center in Downtown Memphis for their 150th Anniversary Concert that featured two new compositions by Col. John Bourgeois and Page Hamilton. In 2026 the band performed at the Hoover Dam, The Grand Canyon, Monument Valley, and the Amargosa Opera House in Death Valley among other performances. The concert tour resulted in the band performing in six states in seven days bringing the total number of states the band has performed in to 36.

== Notable band members ==
- Henry Loeb Sr. (1873) - Owner of Loeb Laundry Business, Philanthropist
- John J. Shea (1873) - Secretary of the City of Memphis in 1891
- George Randolph (1884) - Lawyer, Federal Judge
- William Wallace Saxby, Jr. (1888) - Founder of the Memphis Philharmonic Orchestra, Director of the Memphis Municipal Park Band, Band Director at Christian Brothers
- Eugene Nowland (1888) - Professional European Musician; owner of Eugene Nowland & Company, Paris
- James Saxby (1899) - Professional Musician, Orchestra Leader, Assistant Director of Band at Christian Brothers
- Zachary H. Curlin (1904) - Sports Coach, first coach of what is now the University of Memphis Football and Basketball teams
- Frank Olita, Sr. (1905) - Professional Trumpeter and Violinist
- Lester Bruch (1905) - Professional Trumpeter, Director of the Memphis Federal Band and the Memphis Municipal Park Band
- Philip Canale (1912) - Senior Member of Canale, Glankler, Little, Boone & Loch and the John S. Montedonico Law Firm, Philanthropist
- Lawrence Patrick Cooney (1935) - Composer of the original Memphis State fight song, Messick High School Director, Supervisor of music education for Memphis City Schools
- Louis Joseph Pierini (1936) - Professional Trombonist, Band Leader
- Father Leonard Oglesby, Jr. (1937) - Priest
- Frank J. Glanker (1940) - Lawyer, founder of Glankler Brown PPLC
- Bill Justis (1944) - Sun Studio Recording Artist, Producer, Film Composer
- Br. John Johnston (1951) - Former Superior General of the Brothers of the Christian Schools
- James Richens (1954) - Resident Composer for the Memphis Symphony Orchestra, Professor of Composition at the University of Memphis
- Jesse Winchester (1962) - Musician and Songwriter
- Br. Joel McGraw (1963) - Assistant Principal of Christian Brothers High School
- William "Bill" McKee (1965) - Former band director at Central High School, Christian Brothers Jazz Band "Walnut Groove" director
- David Cook (1969) - Lawyer
- Jack Hale, Jr. (1973) - Record Producer
- Craft Beck (1975) - Conductor of the Mississippi Symphony Orchestra
- Barrett Seals (1991) - United States Coast Guard Band, English Horn
- Blake Allison - Lead singer of Devour the Day, member of Egypt Central
