= All-Japan Band Association =

The All Japan Band Association (AJBA) (全日本吹奏楽連盟/Zennihon Suisōgaku Renmei) is an organization that exists solely for the purpose of facilitating annual music competition among Japanese wind bands. This competition has largely promoted the concert band idiom (called buraban in Japanese), but in recent years, AJBA has also included separate entries for marching band, and smaller chamber music ensembles within its national competition.

The AJBA competition includes categories for elementary school, middle school, high school, university, company, and community bands. It is an extremely competitive three-tiered contest, with local, regional, and national levels of competition. In some categories - middle school for example - the school bands from the most competitive urban districts that manage to reach the national level of competition are statistically among the top 0.5% in all of Japan.

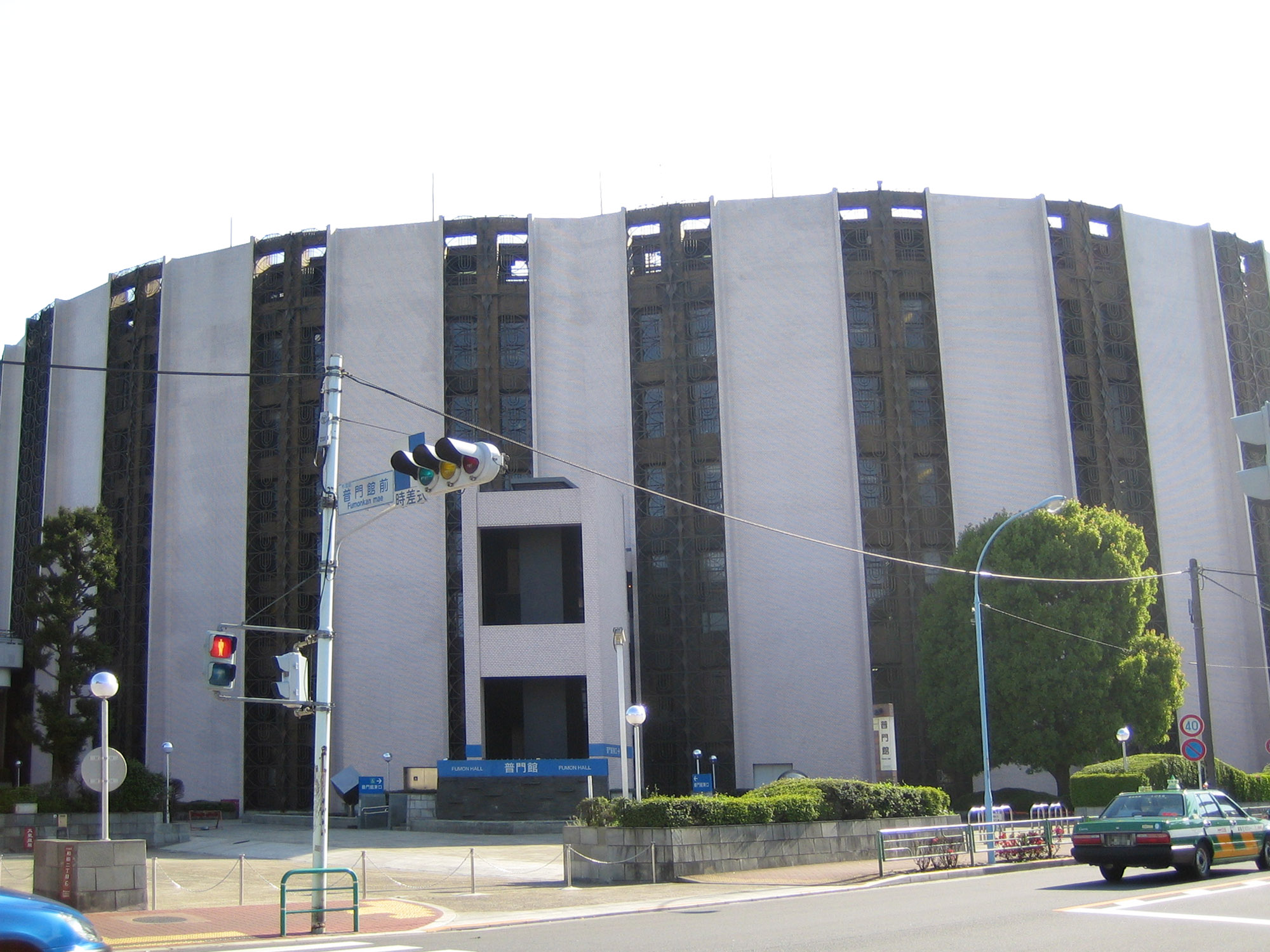
Fumon Hall

The renowned Tokyo Kosei Wind Orchestra is usually hired to make the definitive premier recordings of the required pieces commissioned each year for AJBA's national competition. The final (national) stage of the competition is regularly held in Fumon Hall, an auditorium located on the campus of the Rissho Kosei Kai religious organization in central Tokyo.

Not to be confused with the Japan Marching Band Association (JMBA) (一般社団法人日本マーチングバンド協会)

== World's Largest Music Contest ==
The All Japan Band Association annual contest appears to be the world's largest music competition in terms of the number of active contestants, with approximately 800,000 competing musicians in more than 14,000 bands. The other largest music competitions in the world are the Eurovision and American Idol competitions in the field of pop music singing. While these do not exceed the AJBA competition in terms of the number of competitors, they may be larger in terms of the number of individual entrants, operating budgets, or fans (as these contests involve popular music, are marketed internationally, and enjoy a much higher global profile).

== AJBA Contest Divisions ==
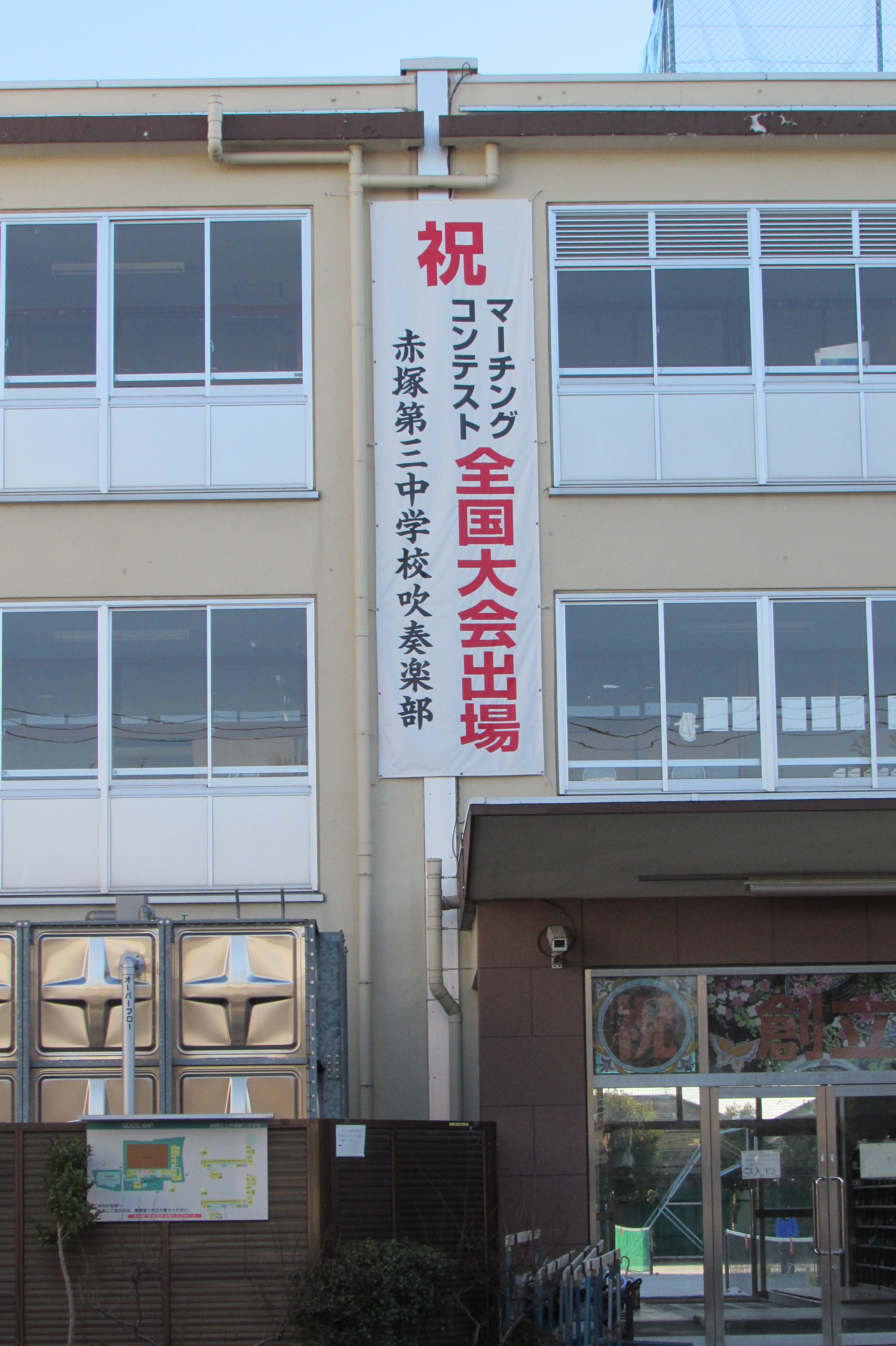
Banner celebrating a school band's participation at national level

The following chart displays a breakdown of competing wind bands in terms of region and category:

1 October 2010 statistics

Divisions	Grade School	Junior High School	High School	College/University	Company	Community	Total by Region
Hokkaido	125	375	224	24	7	116	871
Tohoku	255	737	391	34	10	197	1,624
E.Kanto	238	1,053	516	37	10	221	2,075
W.Kanto	43	782	340	23	5	134	1,327
Tokyo	40	610	295	28	14	114	1,101
Tokai	99	858	509	30	12	185	1,693
Hokuriku	21	211	114	14	0	71	431
Kansai	64	970	532	47	11	350	1,974
Chukoku	75	542	297	37	6	112	1,069
Shikoku	17	259	119	11	2	53	461
Kyushu	148	791	455	46	11	218	1,669
National Totals	1,125	7,188	3,792	331	88	1,771	14,295

Since the average Japanese wind band has around 45 to 55 members, the total national figure probably exceeds 800,000 contestants in any given year, and according to the most recent figures (2010) may even exceed 1 million.

== See also ==
- Buraban
- Wind band
- School band
- Education in Japan
- Music of Japan
