= Jacques Singer =

American conductor (1910–1980)

- Born: Jakob Singer; May 9, 1910; Przemyśl, Poland
- Died: August 11, 1980 (aged 70); Manhattan, New York, U.S.
- Education: Curtis; Juilliard
- Occupations: Violinist; Orchestra conductor University music educator
- Years active: 1925–1980
- Employer(s): As violinist Philadelphia Orchestra As conductor Dallas Symphony; Vancouver Symphony; Corpus Christi Symphony; Oregon Symphony As educator Northern Illinois University
- Spouse: Leslie Wright
- Children: 5 (1 deceased), including Marc Singer and Lori Singer

Jacques Singer (May 9, 1910 – August 11, 1980) was an American virtuoso violinist, symphony orchestra conductor, and music educator who flourished from about 1925 until a few months before his death in 1980.

== Career ==
=== Education ===
Jakob Singer was born in Przemyśl, Austria-Hungary (present-day Poland). He trained in the violin from an early age. He began to give concerts in Poland at age seven. In 1920, his family moved to the United States, settling in Jersey City. Before making any sort of official American debut, Singer, as a teenager, had been playing recitals, in one case, at a Columbia University student social gathering at Earl Hall.

In 1923, Singer became a scholarship violin student of Leopold Auer and his associate, Jacob Mestechkin (1880–1953). (Note: "Local Artist in 'Y' Concert," Jersey Journal, March 9, 1925, p. 7) (Note: "May Day Celebration" (event advertisement by the Socialist Labor Party of America), The Weekly People, May 2, 1925, p. 6 (accessible via fultonhistory.com)) He made his American debut in New York the evening of February 11, 1925, at Town Hall performing (in solo) Bach's G-minor Fugue; (Note: The Bach Fuque cited in Singer's Town Hall concert was likely Bach's Fugue in G minor for violin and harpsichord, BWV 1026) then with pianist Siegfried Schultze, Paganini's D major concerto; then with Schultze and violinist Jacob Mestechkin (his teacher), Christian Sinding's Serenade for two violins and piano. (Note: "Two Young Violinists Appear", New York Times, February 12, 1925, p. 17, col. 1 (accessible via fultonhistory.com)) (Note: "Boy Violinists Give Recital, by William James Henderson, New York Sun, February 12, 1925 Dramatic and Musical Criticisms (Vol. 51 of 57), New York clippings: January 1, 1925 – January 22, 1926, compiled by Philip Hale (1854–1934), p. 44 Digital source: Boston Public Library; OCLC 52493225 (retrieved via Internet Archive))

Singer attended the Curtis Institute of Music on a scholarship in 1926 (Note: "Boys Win Scholarships", The Philadelphia Inquirer, September 30, 1925, p. 12, col. 6 (accessible via fultonhistory.com)) – in the third year after the institute was founded. While there, he studied with Carl Flesch. Curtis did not issue diplomas during its first ten years. Singer was in "The Students' Orchestra for Curtis" 1926–1927 season. Leopold Stokowski was conductor.

Singer began attending the Juilliard School in 1927, studying with Leopold Auer, Paul Kochanski, and Rubin Goldmark. Singer was also a violinist with the Juilliard Graduate School String Orchestra; Albert Stoessel was the conductor. (Note: "Albert Stoessel to Head Juilliard Orchestra," Scarsdale Inquirer, Vol. 10, No. 4, December 14, 1928) Singer graduated from Juilliard in 1930.

=== Philadelphia Orchestra ===
While at Juilliard, Singer became a violinist with the Philadelphia Orchestra at age eighteen, their youngest member at the time. Leopold Stokowski took an interest in him and requested he conduct a contemporary piece at one of the rehearsals in 1935. (Note: "Variations" (correction appended) (book review), by William F. Buckley Jr., New York Times, December 3, 2006 Review of the book, Johann Sebastian Bach: Life and Work, by Martin Geck (de), translated by John Hargraves, Harcourt (2006); OCLC 66463744 (retrieved December 13, 2017)) (Note: "Opera and Concert Asides", New York Times, December 12, 1937, p. X10)

From watching Stokowski, he picked up several of the maestro's practices: conducting without baton (or score at times), making instructional comments to an audience, and stopping performances during disturbances. These he employed as conductor of the orchestra's youth orchestra in 1936.

==== Philadelphia Youth Orchestra ====
In 1936, Singer reorganized and began conducting the Philadelphia Youth Orchestra. The orchestra had been founded in 1934 by Stokowski and, before Singer, was conducted by Sylvan Levin. The orchestra, at that time, was composed of musicians from ages 13 to 25. (Note: "With Some Orchestras", New York Times, November 6, 1936, p. X7)

=== Dallas Symphony: 1938–1942 ===
With a recommendation from Stokowski, (Note: "Jacques Singer's Role – Violinist Engaged to Conduct the Dallas Symphony", New York Times, December 8, 1937) Singer made his conducting debut with the Dallas Symphony Orchestra on February 1, 1938. He remained with that orchestra until 1942. Audience reaction to his style and personality was positive, the symphony budget doubled, and subscriptions tripled. While there, as reported by Time magazine, Singer became engaged in a feud with critic John ("Rosy") Rosenfield (born Max John Rosenfield Jr.; 1900–1966) of The Dallas Morning News.

Rosenfield lauded Singer early on, but soon turned against him. Singer became angry enough to print handbills and make speeches defending himself during concert intermissions.

In spring 1951, Rosenfield published an article in the Southwest Review refuting that a feud transpired, or, rather, that Time's depiction of his criticism was, on balance, overblown, considering the critical acclaim on Singer that he published in The Dallas Morning News.

=== World War II ===
By the 1942–43 season, most of the Dallas Symphony Orchestra's musicians were enlisted in the armed services. (Note: "Symphony Matter Now Up To Music Lovers," by John Rosenfield, Dallas Morning News, September 23, 1942)

During World War II Singer served as a private in the U.S. Army. He saw active service and received three battle stars for New Guinea, Bataan, and Corregidor. He conducted army band concerts, including the first concert given after the liberation of Corregidor. (Note: "Singer Back in Dallas Returns to Civilian Life" by Marynell Sharp (1920–1950), Dallas Morning News, July 9, 1945, p. 6)

=== New Orleans Summer Concerts: 1946 ===
In 1946, he conducted 28 concerts in eight weeks for the summer New Orleans Pops Concerts. (Note: "Musicians Earn Warm Approval – Closing of 'Pops' Concerts Praised", Times-Picayune, August 3, 1946, p. 7)

=== Vancouver Symphony: 1947–1951 ===
A guest conducting engagement with the Vancouver Symphony Orchestra led to his appointment as a conductor of that orchestra from 1947 to 1951. Singer, an advocate of contemporary music (Note: "Promoting the New," by Jacques Singer, New York Times, September 5, 1948, p. X5) by established and emerging composers has been chronicled favorably by musicologists for programing works, including a March 1948 performance by the VSO of Walter Piston's Prelude and Fugue for Orchestra, commissioned in 1934 by the League of Composers.

The First Symposium of Canadian Contemporary Music was held in Vancouver March 12–15, 1950, at the Hotel Vancouver and the Denman Auditorium under the sponsorship of the Vancouver Symphony Society and the Community Arts Council of Vancouver. Singer was the initiator and music director of the Symposium. Alec Walton was chairman of the symposium. The event featured four days of performances of works by 33 Canadian composers, including:

- Violet Archer
- Leonard Edwin Basham (pseudonym Robert Lenard Barclay; 1918–1980)
- John Beckwith
- Richard Tom Bevan (1894–1965)
- Howard Cable
- Edwin Alec Collins (born 1893)
- Robert Fleming
- Harry Freedman
- Ernest MacMillan
- Paul Alexander de Marky (1897–1982)
- Oskar Morawetz
- Bernard Naylor (1907–1986)
- Charles O'Neill
- Kenneth Peacock
- Barbara Pentland
- Clermont Pépin
- Godfrey Ridout
- Harry Somers
- Andrew Twa (1919–2009)
- Alfred Whitehead
- Healey Willan

The Symposium concluded with a panel discussion on Canadian music moderated by Alec Walton, a young banker and brother of composer William Walton. The panelist included Singer, Barbara Pentland, Eugène Lapierre, Dorothy Cadzow (1916–2001), Charles O'Neill, Zilba Georgieva (soprano), John Weinzweig, and Harry Adaskin. (Note: "The Musical Digest – Symposium," by Eric Claudin, Dallas Morning News, April 16, 1950, p. 4) Attended by 1,500, the Symposium was the only venture of its kind on record for Canada and stood as the largest festival of Canadian music until Expo '67.

There are differing explations for Singer's departure from the VSO – one being that he resigned from the symphony over a disagreement with the board over the $19,000 budget deficit (the board wanted a shortened season). Another explanation, offered by musicologist Elaine Keillor, was that the VSO fired Singer over circumstances directly linked to his promotion of contemporary music.

=== Selected performances ===
American composer David Diamond's Violin Concerto No. 2 was premiered on February 29, 1948, by Dorotha Powers, with Singer conducting the VSO. Difficulties with the estate of Arthur W. Percival, Dorotha Powers' husband, prevented further performances of the work for the next 43 years – until May 6, 1991 – when Gerard Schwarz arranged for its second performance, billed as a U.S. première. Percival commissioned the work for his wife through an arrangement with conductor Artur Rodzinski.

On November 27, 1948, Singer, conducting the VSO, premiered Wallingford Riegger's "Evocation."

=== British Columbia Philharmonic: 1951 ===
Singer next founded a rival orchestra, the British Columbia Philharmonic. At the first concert, Victoria Symphony Orchestra's conductor Hans Gruber called the orchestra unprepared and the chorus incompetent, referring to a performance of Beethoven's Symphony No. 9. (Note: "Hans Gruber Braves Vancouver Crowd", Nanaimo Daily News, July 16, 1951, p. 5)

=== Broadway: 1951–1952 ===
On Broadway, from December 19, 1951, through April 13, 1952, at the old Ziegfeld Theatre, Singer conducted a production of two Cleopatras, consisting of two plays presented with live music on alternating nights for 133 performances; the first for 67 performances – George Bernard Shaw's Caesar and Cleopatra; and the second for 66 performances – Shakespeare's Antony and Cleopatra. (Note: "Life Story: Musician and Teacher, John Keil Richards Nurtured the Best in All His Students", The Oregonian, August 6, 2011 (retrieved December 7, 2017)) (Note: "Oliviers Present Antony Tonight – Acting Team Will Take Leads in Shakespeare Drama That Will Alternate With Shaw", New York Times, December 20, 1951) Both plays starred Vivien Leigh and Laurence Olivier. The music was composed by Herbert Menges. Igor Stravinsky, who reportedly attended on opening night, remarked that the pit orchestra sounded like a symphony. (Note: "Ex-Dallasite Now Olivier's Conductor for Cleopatras" (Special to the News), Dallas Morning News, December 22, 1951, p. 4)

=== Israel: 1952 ===
In 1952, Singer guest-conducted the Israel Philharmonic, the Jerusalem Radio Orchestra, and the Haifa Symphony (he). This included the first concert in Nazareth for the Haifa Symphony. (Note: "First Strains of Concert Music Stir the Air of Ancient Nazareth", New York Times, May 11, 1953, Sec L, p. 29) (Note: "Symphony Conductor Pays City Flying Visit," by Mary Gene Kelly, Corpus Christi Caller-Times, June 6, 1954, p. 33 (accessible at www.newspapers.com/image/23838338))

=== Corpus Christi Symphony Orchestra: 1954–1962 ===
The Corpus Christi Symphony Orchestra was established in 1945 by C. Burdette "Bud" Wolfe (1904–1974), who became its first conductor; Rabbi Sidney Abraham Wolf (1906–1983); and six others. Nine years after its founding, Singer became the conductor, conducting his first concert on October 18, 1954. (Note: "Symphony Performance Professional, Exciting", Corpus Christi Caller-Times, October 19, 1954, p. 25) As a marker for the scope of the CCSO, its 1956–1957 budget was $53,000. (Note: "Symphony Finances Reported Encouraging," Corpus Christi Caller-Times,, October 10, 1954, p. 21; (accessible at www.newspapers.com/image/27944506)) Singer served as conductor there from 1954 to 1962.

==== Guest conducting ====
On March 25, 1956, Singer guest-conducted the closing season concert of the Indianapolis Symphony Orchestra, to critical acclaim. (Note: "Symphony in Peak of Sound," by Charles Staff (né Charles Bancroft Staff Jr.; 1929–1999), Indianapolis News, March 26, 1956, p. 10 (accessible at www.newspapers.com/image/311495989))

On January 26, 1958, Singer guest conducted the Havana Philharmonic Orchestra (ru) (Orquesta Filarmónica de la Habana), performing Paul Csonka's Violin Concerto No. 2. The violin soloist, Ángel Reyes, was, at the time, on the faculty at the Northwestern University School of Music. The orchestra, with Singer conducting, also performed Sibelius' Symphony No. 1 and works by Chausson.

Beginning around April 1958, Singer, as visiting conductor, led the Buenos Aires Philharmonic at the Colon Theater in Argentina. Reviews of a concert on June 22, 1958, by two Buenos Aires newspapers, Democracia and La Prensa lauded Singer's artistic accomplishments (after working two months with the orchestra). One critic referred to Singer as a miracle worker. (Note: "Jacques Singer Acclaimed" (Buenos Aires AP), New York Times, June 2, 1958) (Note: "Paper Says Singer Works 'Miracle' With Orchestra" (Buenos Aires AP), Corpus Christi Caller-Times, June 24, 1958, p. 8) (Note: "U.S. Conductor Praised – Texan 'Worked Miracles' on Buenos Aires Orchestra" (Buenos Aires AP), New York Times, June 24, 1958, p. 3)

In 1961, Singer spent a month with the Venezuela Symphony Orchestra, culminating in 4 concerts, the first on April 29. The concerts received critical acclaim. (Note: "Singer Conducts in Venezuela," New York Times, April 30, 1961, p. 6)

=== Oregon Symphony: 1962–1972 ===
Singer debuted with the Oregon Symphony – then the Portland Symphony Orchestra – as a guest conductor in February 1962. Critics gave Singer favorable reviews. Martin Clark (born Martin Hooper Clark; 1920–1983) of the Oregon Journal, wrote, "Never has the orchestra been more responsive to a baton." (Note: "Singer All the Way in Monday Concert," by Martin Clark, The Oregon Journal, February 20, 1962 Martin Hooper Clark (1920–1983), was music critic for the Oregon Journal, then The Oregonian) (Note: "Music Maestro Jacques Singer Will Launch Symphony Oct. 15," The Oregonian, August 26, 1962, p. 95) (Note: "Conductor is Praised in Oregon," Corpus Christi Caller-Times, March 8, 1962, p. 38)

Singer had signed on with Corpus Christi for an additional three years when he was hired as the permanent conductor and music director of the Oregon Symphony in April 1962. (Note: "Singer Gets Unconditional Release from Texas Symphony to Assume Portland Position", The Oregonian, April 13, 1962, p. 21) He served there from 1962 to 1972. In his first season (1962–63), the orchestra performed 47 weeks of concerts – the second most by an orchestra of its size in the United States. Singer changed the scope of the orchestra. Specifically, under Singer, the musicians secured full-time contracts, the orchestra began a series of tours throughout the state of Oregon, and in 1967, the name changed from the Portland Symphany Orchestra to the Oregon Symphony Orchestra.

Early in his tenure, Singer requested the concertmaster's violin to demonstrate a passage. Tubaist John Richards (né John Keil Richards; 1918–2011) recounted the incident: "He tucked it under his chin and played four or five bars to show what he wanted. The rest of the string section sat openmouthed at how well he could play."

Singer proved to be a temperamental conductor there as recounted by a violinist in The Oregonian. In rehearsal one day, Singer told the tubaist John Richards, "I can't hear you". On the next run-through, Richards blasted the note louder. "Still can't hear you", said Singer. The next time, Richards blew the tuba with both lungs. "I still can't hear you", said Singer. Richards was getting angry by now, but Singer chose this moment to tie a white handkerchief onto his baton with which he waved a flag of surrender. (Note: "Parting Notes" by David Stabler, The Oregonian, June 9, 1999, p. C1)

Singer, throughout his career, was an exponent of new music from established and emerging composers, which, in programming, he had to carefully balance, particularly with orchestras whose benefactors and patrons yearned for the classics. Singer, with the Oregon Symphony, performed many contemporary works that won favorable reviews, including a 1969 performance of Paul Creston's tone poem, Corinthians XIII, Op. 82, composed in 1963.

It is difficult, even with the best verbalization of the composer's concept, to persuade a listener to recognize and respond to such expressed thoughts. But here is a case in which, without any extraneous suggestion, one has come upon an orchestral work of remarkable beauty. Corinthians XIII is melodically rich, rhythmically intensive, fluid and engrossing in its instrumental movement, fascinating in its counter themes and harmonic diversity.

— Hilmar Birger Grondahl, The Oregonian, 1969 (Note: "Vigorous, 'Ingenious Toccata' Opens New Symphony Season," by Hilmar Birger Grondahl (1899–1984), The Oregonian, October 7, 1969, p. 38 (Grondahl was the classical music critic for The Oregonian for 45 years))

Singer ultimately left the orchestra he had built, over a controversy that divided the organization. His attempt to bring in a new concertmaster led to a stand-off between the union and the artistic freedom of a conductor. The concertmaster that Singer wanted replaced – Hugh Winchester Ewart (1924–2017), who had held the position since 1950 – was, in 1973, pressured to surrender his chair, and he declined a demotion offer to become associate concertmaster. Soon thereafter, still in 1973, a new concertmaster, Michael Foxman, was appointed. The upshot of Singer's exit related to disagreements over artistic freedom and a rift with some of the musicians. Singer believed in artistry over rules and regulations. Quality, reportedly, ruled his artistic domain. (Note: "Sour Note" by Herbert Francis Lundy (1907–1994), The Oregonian, October 30, 1971) (Note: "Symphony Society, Local Musicians Union in Controversy" by John Wendeborn, The Oregonian, December 26, 1971, p. 103) His contract with the Oregon Symphony extended through April 1973, though he did not conduct during the 1972–73 season. (Note: "Jacques Singer Freed – Guest to Conduct Oregon Symphony," The Oregonian, August 9, 1972, p. 18)

==== Selected performances ====
1. March 18, 1963
  Robert Russell Bennett, composer
  Concerto for Violin, Piano, and Orchestra, premiere
  Benno and Sylvia Rabinof, soloists

==== Guest conducting ====
On September 24, 1962, before starting as artistic director of the Oregon Symphony, Singer made his London debut conducting the London Philharmonic at Royal Festival Hall, which included guest pianist Rudolf Firkušný. The performance won Singer and Firkušný eight curtain calls and a music critic from London's Daily Telegraph declared it a "personal triumph" for Singer. (Note: "Good Seats Still on Sale for Portland Symphony", The Oregonian, October 14, 1962, p. 89)

On December 8, 1964, Singer flew from Portland to New York to conduct members of American Symphony Orchestra at Lincoln Center's Philharmic Hall in a program that featured violinist Ruggiero Ricci performing his third of four concerts in a span of 30 days under a different conductor each time, showcasing great masterpieces of violin concerto repertoire – 15 concertos in all: (Note: "Ricci To Open Series of Four Concerts Nov. 17," New York Post, December 6, 1964, p. 68 (accessible via fultonhistory.com)) (Note: "Conductor to Appear in N.Y. Experiments," The Oregonian, December 6, 1964, p. 128)

1. December 8, 1964, Jacques Singer, conductor
  Paganini Violin Concerto No. 1
  Stravinsky Violin Concerto
  Brahms Violin Concerto

Ricci, November 8 and 9, 1965, reunited with Singer in Portland, with the Oregon Symphony, and performed the Paganini, Stravinsky, and Brahms concertos. (Note: "Jacques Singer, Ricci To Reunite in Portland," The Oregonian, August 22, 1965, p. 83)

On April 17, 1970, Singer debuted with the Royal Philharmonic Orchestra at Royal Festival Hall as guest conductor of a program that included a London debut of a piano concerto by Richard Yardumian, performed by Jeffrey Siegel. (Note: "Rehearsing New Work", The Guardian, April 17, 1970, p. 5)

On January 11, 1972, Singer conducted the Honolulu Symphony featuring pianist John Browning. In early June 1972, Singer conducted the Orchestre de la Suisse Romande in Geneva, to critical acclaim, featuring works of Beethoven, Prokofiev, and Rachmaninoff (Rhapsody on a Theme of Paganini, Giuseppe La Licata at the piano). (Note: "Singer Lauded in Switzerland," The Oregonian, June 18, 1972, p. 67) The concert was broadcast countrywide.

On June 18, 1972, and again on January 18 & 21, 1973, he guest-conducted the Venezuela Symphony Orchestra. The June 18 concert included the Venezuela premier of Shostakovich's Symphony No. 12. (Note: "Symphony Directed," The Oregonian, July 2, 1972, p. 79)

=== Naumburg Orchestral Concerts in Central Park: 1974–1979 ===
Singer moved to New York. During those years, part-time, he conducted the Naumburg Orchestral Concerts for six summer seasons (1974–79), in the Naumburg Bandshell, Central Park, in the summer series.

==== Programs ====
1. July 4, 1974, 7:30 p.m.
  Robert Sylvester, cello soloist
  Schubert
  Herbert
  Dvořák
2. August 3, 1975, 5 to 7:30 p.m.
  Leslie N. Parnas, cello soloist
3. August 1, 1976, 5 to 7:30 p.m., broadcast on WNYC-FM
  Yong Uck Kim (born 1947) violin soloist
  Saint-Saëns, Violin Concerto No. 3 in B Minor
  Ben Franklin, Ben Franklin Suite, arranged by Alan Shulman
  Mozart, Symphony No. 41, the Jupiter Symphony
4. July 31, 1977, 5 to 7:30 p.m., broadcast on WNYC-FM
  Hamao Fujiwara (born 1947), violin soloist
  Rossini, "Overture": La gazza ladra
  Gid Waldrop, "Rancher's whistling Song," From the Southwest (suite)
  Glazounov, Concerto in A Minor, Op. 82
  Saint-Saëns, Introduction and Rondo Capriccioso, Op. 28
  Dvorák, Symphony No. 8 in G Major, Op. 88
  (Gideon William Waldrop Jr.; 1917–2000, was, among other things, Dean of the Juilliard School from 1963 to 1986 and President of the Manhattan School of Music from 1986 to 1989)
5. July 30, 1978, 5 to 7:30 p.m.
  Leslie N. Parnas, cello soloist
  Bernstein, Overture, from Candide
  Beethoven, Symphony No. 7 in A Major
  Haydn, Cello Concerto in D Major
  Rimsky-Korsakov, Capriccio Espagnol, Op. 34
6. August 2, 1979, 8:00 p.m., broadcast on WNYC-FM
  Joseph Fuchs, violin soloist
  Beethoven, Symphony No. 5
  Mendelssohn, Violin Concerto
  Shostakovich, Festival Overture

=== Northern Illinois University: 1977–1980 ===
Singer became an artist in residence at Northern Illinois University, and from 1977 until shortly before his death in 1980, he conducted the Northern Illinois University Philharmonic. Singer's wife, Leslie, an accomplished pianist, left the Juilliard staff 1978 to take over the piano classes of Reynolds Whitney (1919–1978), a member of the NIU music faculty since 1948 who died January 2, 1978. (Note: Reynolds Whitney – Detroit Mich.," Daily Chronicle, January 4, 1978, p. 5 (accisable at www.newspapers.com/image/123496131)) (Note: "Singer Conducts Philharmonic in Season's Final Spring Concert," Daily Chronicle, April 7, 1977, p. 12 (accessible at www.newspapers.com/image/123515749))

==== Guest conducting ====
In 1974, Jacques Singer guest-conducted the Cosmopolitan Symphony, a New York City youth orchestra founded in 1963. (Note: "Reyes in Debut With Youth Group," New York Times, December 15, 1974, p. 68) He enjoyed encouraging young artists, and delighted in guest conducting rehearsals or concerts of the New York conservatories, which included those of Juilliard and the Manhattan School of Music, as well as high school musicians, which included his daughter Lori.

=== Death ===
Jacques Singer died August 11, 1980, at his home in Manhattan, New York, aged 70.

== Family ==
Jakob Singer was one of three children born to Meyer Singer (aka Mark Eli Singer; 1877–1922) and Rachella Bach (1881–1937). Meyer, Rachella (later known as "Rose" or "Rosie"), and their three children immigrated to the United States, sailing from Bremen on October 21, 1920, aboard the USS Susquehanna, and arriving in the Port of New York November 4, 1920. According to the ship's manifest, their nearest relative, Elias Singer (Jakob's grandfather), was residing in Jersey City. The manifest listed Meyer Singer's occupation as "chanter".

Sometime after the death of Meyer Singer in 1922, Jakob, his mother, and his younger sister, Bronja, lived with Jacques' uncle and aunt, Solomon Singer (1892–1970) and Ruth Singer (1905–1968) along with Solomon and Ruth's son, Nobert Dave Singer (born 1929) and a cousin, Emanuel B. Bach (born around 1900). Their address in 1930 was 283 York Street, Jersey City, across the street from Van Vorst Park.

Jacques Singer became a naturalized citizen sometime between 1920 and 1930 in Philadelphia.

On January 28, 1946, in New York City Jacques married Leslie Wright (born 1924), a Texas piano virtuoso and pedagogue who, in the early 1940s, studied at the University of North Texas College of Music with Silvio Scionti and in the latter 1940s, in New York with Sidney Foster (né Sidney Earl Finkelstein; 1917–1977).

Foster was a friend of Jacques who, on October 29, 1939, married Jacques' sister, Bessie (née Bronja Singer; 1916–2016), (Note: "Bronja J. Foster, 99" (obituary), Herald-Times (Bloomington, Indiana), May 7 & 9, 2016) also a pianist and later longtime music professor at Indiana University Bloomington's Jacobs School of Music. Sidney Foster and Bronja Singer both graduated from the Curtis Institute of Music on May 17, 1938, with Diplomas in Piano.

Jacques and Leslie had four children: Claude, Marc, Lori, and Gregory. Lori and Gregory are twins. Marc and Lori are actors. Claude is a brand strategist in New York City. Gregory, a Juilliard graduate, is a prolific violinist, conductor, and pedagogue, is the music director of the Manhattan Symphonie, which he founded in 2005.

Jacques Singer's nephew once removed, Bryan, is a prolific film producer/director. He was adopted and raised by Nobert Dave Singer (born 1929) and Grace L. Sinden (née Weinstein; born 1933), who were married to each other between 1954 and 1977. Nobert's father, Solomon Singer (1892–1970) (Jacques' uncle), was a concert violinist, conductor, and violin teacher. Jacques and Leslie had a fifth child, a son, who died at birth in Dallas, April 1, 1950.

== Awards ==
- 1959: Gold Medal, Buenos Aires Philharmonic

Cultural offices
Preceded by Paul van Katwijk	Music Director; Dallas Symphony Orchestra; 1937–1942	Vacant performances suspended during World War II Title next held by Antal Doráti; Appointed 1945
Preceded by Allard de Ridder	Music Director; Vancouver Symphony Orchestra; 1947–1951	Succeeded by Irwin Hoffman
Preceded by Frederick Vajda	Music Director; Corpus Christi Symphony Orchestra; 1954–1962	Succeeded by Maurice Peress
Preceded by Piero Bellugi	Music Director; Oregon Symphony Orchestra; 1962–1972	Succeeded by Guest conductors 1972–1973 season Lawrence Leighton Smith; Appointed April 1973
Academic offices
Preceded by Larry Livingston; Director of Instrumental Activities; Conductor, NIU Symphony Orchestra	Northern Illinois University; College of Visual and Performing Arts; Conductor, Philharmonic Orchestra; 1977–1980; Artist in Residence (also Instructor of Violin)	Succeeded by Carl Walter Roskott

== Discography and extant recordings ==
Very few recordings of Singer exist. Some extant tapes, however, are archived in various music libraries of institutions where Singer conducted.

1. Ruggiero Ricci; Lalo
  1. Fantaisie Norvégienne in A Major
    1. Allegretto non troppo
    2. Andante
    3. Allegro
    Orchestra of the Americas, Singer, conductor
  2. Concerto Russe in G Minor, Op. 29
    1. Prelude-Allegro (Andante)
    2. Chanto Russe (Lento)
    3. Intermezzo (Allegro non troppo)
    4. Introduction - Chanto Russe (Andante)
    Orchestra of the Americas, Singer, conductor
  3. Concerto in F Major, Op. 20
    1. Andante
    2. Andantino (Romance)
    3. Allegro con fuoco
    Orchestra of the Americas, Singer, conductor
  4. Guitare in B Minor, Op. 28
    Zagreb Philharmonic Orchestra
    T Woytowicz, conductor
  Ruggiero Ricci, violin
  Édouard Lalo, composer
  One-Eleven, Ltd. (Hong Kong)
  EPR-95040 (catalog no.) (CD)
  (EPR = Essential Performance Reference)
  (released July 1, 1997)
  OCLC 57036212
2. Indiana University Philharmonic Orchestra Jacques Singer, guest conductor
  February 8, 1972
  3 audiotape reels: analog
  1. Beethoven Symphony No. 3 in E-Flat Major, Op. 55 ("Eroica")
    1. Allegro con brio (E♭ major)
    2. Marcia funebre: Adagio assai (C minor)
    3. Scherzo: Allegro vivace (E♭ major)
    4. Finale: Allegro molto (E♭ major)
  2. Mussorgsky, orchestrated by Ravel
    Pictures at an Exhibition
  OCLC 31318978

== Notes and references ==
=== General references: books ===
- Symphony Conductors of the U.S.A. by Hope Stoddard (1900–1987), New York: Thomas Y. Crowell (1957), p. 375; OCLC 1238874
- Living Musicians, 1st supplement, compiled by David Ewen (1897–1985), H.W. Wilson Co. (1957), p. 144; OCLC 14400974, 438405934, 830199807

=== General references: articles ===
- "Role of Music in Israel", interview with Jacques Singer, The Etude, Vol. 72, No. 7, July 1954, pp. 13 & 61 (accessible via digitalcommons.gardner-webb.edu/etude/105)
- Portland Symphony Program, February 28, 1966; OCLC 29204931
- "Symphony Conductor Singer Fired", The Oregon Journal, December 17, 1971, p. 1
- Social Security Death Index (as a reference for DOB)
