= William Wirtz (American football) =

American football, basketball, and baseball coach

Biographical details
- Born: June 25, 1887; Sandwich, Illinois, U.S.
- Died: June 14, 1965 (aged 77); DeKalb, Illinois, U.S.

Coaching career (HC unless noted)

Football
- 1910–1916: Northern Illinois State Normal

Basketball
- 1910–1918: Northern Illinois State Normal

Baseball
- 1912–1917: Northern Illinois State Normal

Head coaching record
- Overall: 33–17–9 (football); 57–31 (basketball); 29–15–1 (baseball)

William Wilbur Wirtz (June 25, 1887 – June 14, 1965) was a professor of foreign languages who also served as athletic director at Northern Illinois University. He was the head football coach at NIU from 1910 to 1916, compiling a record of 33–17–9. Wirtz was also the head basketball coach at Northern Illinois from 1910 to 1918 and the head baseball coach at the school from 1912 to 1917.

Wirtz grew up in Sandwich, Illinois and began his teaching career at age 19. He joined the faculty of Northern Illinois University in the early days of the school, then known as Northern Illinois State Normal School. He was on NIU's governing board from 1949 to 1953, serving as chairman for the last two years. He also served on the Illinois Teachers College Board.

Wirtz Hall on the NIU campus was named after him. The building was the original home of the NIU College of Business. Groundbreaking for Wirtz Hall took place in 1962, and the dedication ceremony was held in 1965 five months after Wirtz's death.

Wirtz married Alfa Belle White and had three daughters, Marion, Frances and Kathryn, and two sons, Robert and William Willard. His son W. Willard Wirtz went on to serve as the Secretary of Labor between 1962 and 1969 under John F. Kennedy and Lyndon B. Johnson. He died on June 14, 1965, at the age of 77.

== Head coaching record ==
=== Football ===
Year	Team	Overall	Conference	Standing	Bowl/playoffs
Northern Illinois State Normal (Independent) (1910–1916)
1910	Northern Illinois State Normal	4–2–1			
1911	Northern Illinois State Normal	8–1–2			
1912	Northern Illinois State Normal	3–5			
1913	Northern Illinois State Normal	3–3–3			
1914	Northern Illinois State Normal	7–0–1			
1915	Northern Illinois State Normal	2–5–1			
1916	Northern Illinois State Normal	6–1–1			
Northern Illinois State Normal:		33–17–9			
Total:		33–17–9			
