= Chelsea Park =

Public park in Manhattan, New York

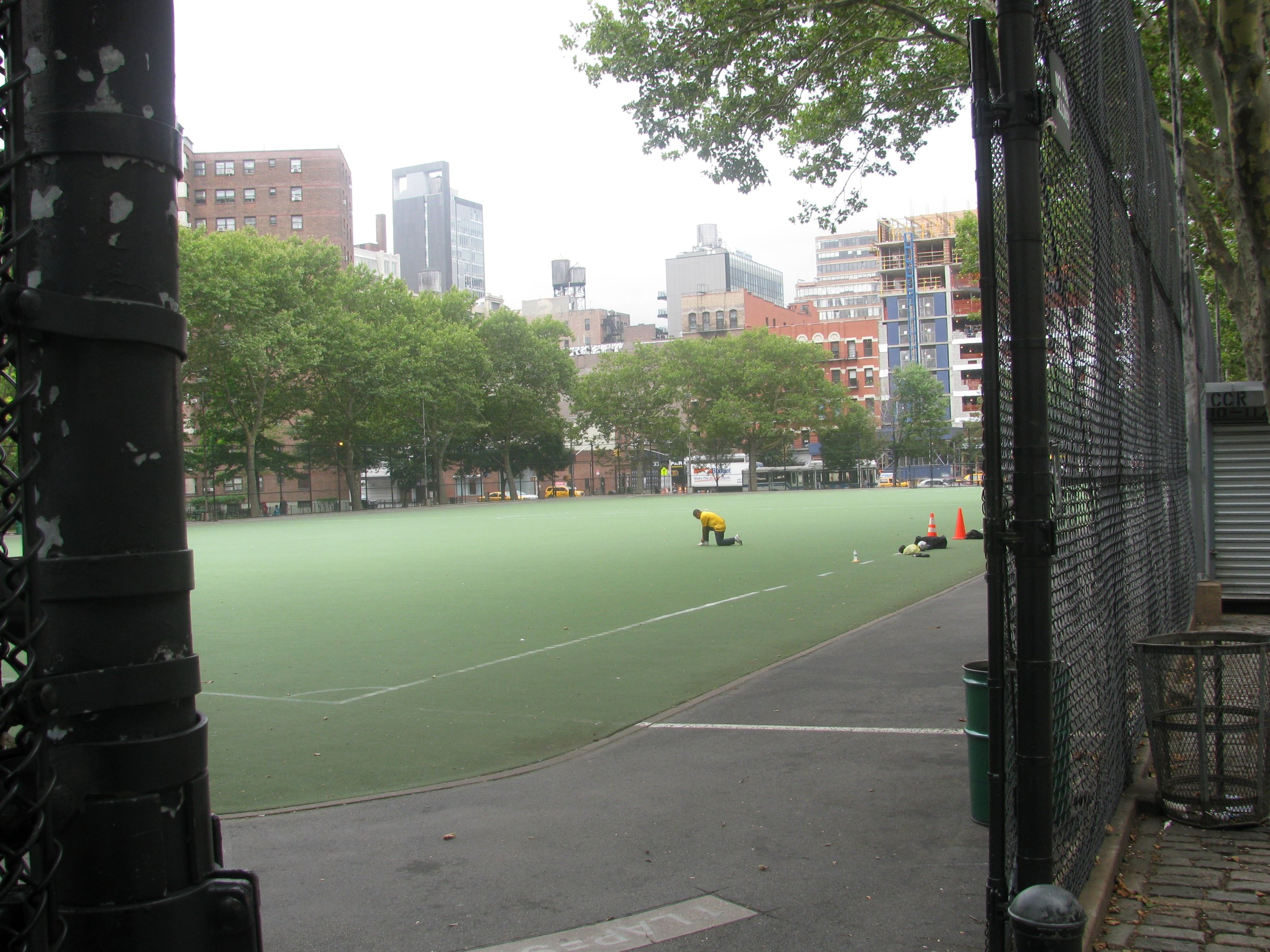
- Artificial turf soccer field
- Interactive map of Chelsea Park
- Type: Urban park
- Location: Bounded by Ninth & Tenth Avenues and West 27th & 28th Streets
- Nearest city: New York City
- Coordinates: 40.750030°N 74.000923°W
- Created: 1910
- Operator: New York City Department of Parks and Recreation

Chelsea Park is a park in the Chelsea neighborhood of Manhattan, New York City, that dates back to 1910. The park has sports fields, basketball and handball courts, a children's playground and space for sitting. The surface is mostly tarmac or artificial turf, with pits for the plane trees and some plots with annual flower plantings. There is a statue to a World War I soldier, the "Doughboy Statue", erected in 1921. The process of approval, funding and clearing the tenements that occupied the site was protracted. The park has since been upgraded several times by the Works Progress Administration and the New York City Department of Parks and Recreation.

== Location ==
Chelsea Park is located between Ninth and Tenth Avenues, and between West 27th and West 28th Streets in Manhattan. The park covers almost 4 acres (1.6 ha). There is fencing around the park to contain the active play areas, with gates at various points. The soccer pitch is surrounded by taller fencing while the rest of the park is surrounded by shorter fences.

The area between West 26th and West 28th Streets and 9th and 10th Avenues is a superblock, comprising two normal-sized blocks. West 27th Drive is a driveway used only for service access, with the park occupying most of the block to the north of the drive. To the south along 26th Street are three 12-to-14-story brick towers run by the New York City Housing Authority in the southern part of the superblock, as well as a public school (PS 33 Chelsea Prep) and the Hudson Guild Settlement House. The annex to the Morgan General Mail Facility occupies the block directly to the north of the park. The Church of the Holy Apostles, built in 1848, is located on the east side of 9th Avenue across from the park. It is located within the Penn South housing complex.

== Physical ==
=== Infrastructure ===
Chelsea Park has spaces for both passive and active recreation. It is one of the busier parks in the neighborhood. It contains baseball diamonds, basketball courts and six handball courts. The artificial turf sports field covers about one third of the area. The P.O. David Willis Basketball Court is named after the New York City Police Department officer David Willis (1964–95), who used to patrol the park. There are public washrooms at West 27th Street and 9th Avenue, open year-round. The park contains a District Health Center, a low-rise red brick building in the eastern part of the park.

=== Ecology ===
There are no artificial or natural ponds. As of 2008 there were 27 mature London plane (Platanus × hispanica) trees with heights of 15 to 20 metres (49 to 66 ft) around the perimeter of the park, and another 28 similar trees scattered through the interior. Most of the trees are in pits, because most of the ground surface is impermeable. The beds of annual plants around the monument and the health center are the only vegetated and permeable areas of the park other than the tree pits. The northwest section of the park has less vegetation than the southeast section.

The six-story Morgan Mail Building along the northern perimeter is a high-collision site for birds, with collisions peaking in mid May. The first two stories of the building have featureless concrete walls, while the upper four stories are 75% covered with reflective glass panels installed over the concrete wall to give the appearance of windows. A study in the spring and autumn of 2005 and 2006 collected the corpses of many migratory birds that had collided with the windows of the six-story USPS building, deceived by the reflections of the greenery in the park. It seemed that the birds generally had adequate stores of fat (energy), and it was not clear whether they were stopping in Chelsea Park to replenish their energy or as a reaction to the inhospitable and unfamiliar city landscape. About 80% of collisions are fatal, with most collisions occurring during the day. Most are found along the southeast perimeter, where there are most trees, while relatively few are found along the playing field perimeter. This suggests that the reflections of trees in the glass panels are a major factor.

=== Doughboy Statue ===
Sketch map. BB: Baseball diamond; HB: Handball; BSK: Basketball; GP: Gateposts; MO: Monument

The park is one of nine New York City parks with monuments to local heroes of World War I (1914–18). The Chelsea Park Memorial, also known as the Doughboy Statue, is a granite stele 14 feet (4.3 m) tall fronted by a plinth supporting a bronze statue of an American soldier. ("Doughboy" is a slang term for an infantryman that was widely used in World War I.) The plinth bears the inscription: "To the Soldiers and Sailors of Chelsea World War 1914–1918". The monument is surrounded by cobblestone. It stands in front of the more recently built Health Center.

The memorial was designed by the architect Charles Rollinson Lamb (1860–1942). The statue was created by the French-born sculptor Philip Martiny (1858–1927) and cast by the Roman Bronze Works foundry of New York. The soldier holds a rifle and has a flag draped over his shoulders. He strikes a commanding pose, defying the enemy. The city's Art Commission, chaired by sculptor Robert Aitken, rejected Martiny's first submission in which the doughboy's pose was less dynamic. Martiny used the same model for the doughboy as he did for his next statue of a soldier, in Greenwich Village. The soldier's aggressive pose is exactly the same as in Martiny's poster for the propaganda film Under Four Flags (1918).

=== Gateposts ===
Also in front of the District Health Center there are two pairs of memorial gate posts that were commissioned by the Horatio Seymour Tammany Club and installed in 1926. They commemorate the former borough president Frank L Dowling, the municipal civic court leader Frank J. Goodwin and the New York State Democratic Committee member William L. Kavanagh.

== History ==
=== Prior to Parkland ===
In the second half of the 19th century, site of Chelsea Park contained an elementary school built in the 1850s, which shared the block with light industries and tenements.

=== Early years (1904–18) ===
The Chelsea Improvement Society proposed a playground for the park's current location in 1904 due to the paucity of parks along Ninth Avenue, with no parks on the street between DeWitt Clinton Park at 53rd Street and Hudson Park at Varick Street. At the time, P.S. 33 occupied an adjacent lot. Land had been set aside for a proposed Carnegie library to the east. The rest of the area was full of tenements. One reader wrote to The New York Times opposing the park and advocating another park site further north that would be located near a greater number of people. Another reader proposed a larger park. The legislature passed bills authorizing the park twice, but both times the mayor vetoed the bills as an "infringement of home rule". $2.23 million was set aside to acquire the park in summer 1905.

The city's parks department finally acquired the titles for all the required properties in 1906. At the time, the acquisition comprised approximately 3.177 acres (1.286 ha). Demolitions continued at a slow pace: by July 1907, only two cellars had been cleared. Filling started on the excavated properties by the end of that year. A temporary playground was built in 1908. The first permanent playground in the park was opened in June 1910. By that time, a baseball field was planned for the park. The New York City Board of Recreation, which had recently been formed, began to arrange sporting events that drew crowds of spectators.

=== Interwar period (1919–41) ===
The Chelsea Doughboy Statue, which cost $10,000, was donated by the Chelsea Memorial Committee and dedicated on April 7, 1921. The decorative gateposts commemorating Dowling, Goodwin, and Kavanagh were installed in 1926. On August 18, 1925, a water tower from a nearby building collapsed on the park, injuring two children.

The Department of Parks reconstructed a section of the park from 1934 and 1936, and it reopened on June 25, 1936. In its announcement advertising the park's reopening, the Department of Parks said, "…the reconstructed area will have a large play area with one ball field, handball courts, complete play equipment for small children and a wading pool." A 60-by-100-foot (18 by 30 m), $175,000 health center for the middle of the park was proposed in 1935. Its cost later grew to $264,000. The Lower West Side Health Center, as it was called, was built as part of the Public Works Administration. The Health Center Building was opened to the public in July 1937. It was in the eastern part of the park and had a public playground on the roof. The Lower West Side Health Center was one of 8 clinics that were opened in the city that year, out of a total of 30 health centers that had been proposed for the city. At the time of its opening, there were 250,000 people living within the health center's service area.

A proposal to demolish the P.S. 33 building and replace it with an extension of the park was rejected in 1938. The Works Progress Administration (WPA) made further changes to the playground. They added a new area of asphalt in the west of the park, "graded so that it can be flooded for ice-skating when sub-freezing temperatures permit. In season it will be used for roller skating, roller hockey, softball, basketball and other group games." The WPA also built three basketball courts, three handball courts, two courts for pitching horseshoes, and one for skittles. This replaced the single baseball diamond that had formerly occupied that portion of the park. The 1940 restoration added floodlights to the softball diamonds. The children's playground was fully equipped with a large wading pool and brick washrooms, while the playground on the roof of the Health Center Building was converted to a sitting area. The WPA-restored park was officially opened on June 6, 1940, in a ceremony attended by Mayor Fiorello H. La Guardia and Parks Commissioner Robert Moses. At the time, it was hoped that the existing P.S. 33 structure would be relocated at a future date so the park could be expanded.

=== Postwar changes (1945–present) ===
In 1949, the New York City Planning Commission approved a project to add eight new recreation centers citywide, including a $450,000 indoor swimming pool in Chelsea Park, In November 1953, an extension to the park opened on the grounds of P.S. 33. (Note: A New York Times report and a press release from NYC Parks in November 1953 both announced the opening of the annex on that date. However, a more recent NYC Parks webpage says the extension on the grounds of P.S. 33 opened in 1952.) The new additions included two handball courts, three basketball courts, and exercise equipment.

In 1962, plans were announced to build a new post office annex between 28th and 29th Streets, immediately north of the park. The location was occupied by 215 families at the time. A fire in 1967 destroyed the Morgan Post Office Station, one block north of the park between 29th and 30th Streets. As of 1977 the park had recently been converted into an tarmac-based "adventure park" with a variety of playground equipment. That year, an environmental impact assessment for the post office annex was conducted. By 1979, the post office station had not been rebuilt, and the block between 28th and 29th Streets had remained undeveloped for over a decade. A postal truck facility planned for that block, which was canceled due to community opposition, was rebuilt at 11th Avenue between 24th and 26th Streets in 1988.

In 1988 the park was well-used from April to November, and the baseball fields were often fully booked. Crime was not a serious problem. The park was being used by homeless people, particularly at the 9th Avenue end, which discouraged the residents of the neighborhood from using that part. An upgrade to the active play equipment in the center portion of the park was planned for the Fall of 1988. In January 1989 a final Environmental Impact Statement (FEIS) was published for a Manhattan General Mail Facility Complex across West 28th Street. As part of the FEIS, upgrades to the park were proposed.

The playground and basketball courts were restored in the mid-1990s. The park was again upgraded in the decade leading up to 2016, but the six handball courts remained dilapidated. The New York City Parks Department, supported by the Fairway Community Foundation, finished refurbishment of the handball courts in 2016. Holes in the walls were patched up and the walls were repainted. The city spent $127,000 on renovations of Chelsea Park as well as at Coffey Park in Red Hook, Brooklyn. Parks Department Commissioner Mitchell Silver was present at a ribbon-cutting ceremony for the handball courts in August 2016.

== Sources ==
- "$4,000,000 VOTED FOR PARKS" (PDF). New York Press. June 30, 1906. p. 10 – via Fultonhistory.com.
- "11 NEW PLAY AREAS WILL OPEN TODAY; Four of the Spots for Younger Children in Central Park -- Also Four in Brooklyn. MORE TO BE IN USE LATER Variety of Equipment Has Been Set Up -- Opening Tomorrow of New Jefferson Pool" (PDF). The New York Times. June 26, 1936.
- "1906 New York City Department of Public Parks Annual Report" (PDF). nyc.gov. New York City Department of Parks and Recreation. 1906. Archived from the original (PDF) on February 11, 2017.
- "1907 New York City Department of Public Parks Annual Report" (PDF). nyc.gov. New York City Department of Parks and Recreation. December 31, 1907. Archived from the original (PDF) on January 16, 2017.
- "1908 New York City Department of Public Parks Annual Report, Part 1" (PDF). nyc.gov. New York City Department of Parks and Recreation. 1908.
- "1910 New York City Department of Public Parks Annual Report" (PDF). nyc.gov. New York City Department of Parks and Recreation. 1910.
- "1940 Parks Department Press Releases (Part 1)" (PDF). nyc.gov. New York City Department of Parks and Recreation. 1940. Archived from the original (PDF) on February 17, 2017.
- "1953 Parks Department Press Releases (Part 1)" (PDF). nyc.gov. New York City Department of Parks and Recreation. 1953.
- "A CHELSEA PLAYGROUND" (PDF). The New York Times. September 9, 1904. ISSN 0362-4331.
- "A WEST SIDE PARK" (PDF). The New York Times. August 14, 1904. ISSN 0362-4331.
- "ALL BARE PLOTS TO BE PLAYGROUNDS; Park Commissioner Stover Tells of His Plans to Make the Lives of Children Happier" (PDF). The New York Times. March 2, 1910. ISSN 0362-4331.
- Asbury, Edith Evans (April 9, 1979). "An Empty Block At Postal Annex Costing Millions". The New York Times.
- "BOARD ABANDONS PLAN FOR SCHOOL IN PARK; Protests Against Building in Chelsea Area Result in Dropping of Project" (PDF). The New York Times. February 2, 1938.
- Chelsea Park, NYC Parks
- Chelsea Park Memorial (Doughboy), NYC Parks
- "CHELSEA PARK DELAYED" (PDF). New York Daily Tribune. July 23, 1907. p. 8 – via Fultonhistory.com.
- "Chelsea Park Enlarged" (PDF). The New York Times. November 11, 1953. ISSN 0362-4331.
- "CHELSEA PARK OPPOSED.; Middle West Sider Argues for Block Further North" (PDF). The New York Times. September 10, 1904. ISSN 0362-4331.
- Cruz, Frank da (October 6, 2016), "Chelsea Park – New York NY", Living New Deal
- Edwards and Kelcey (1977), Manhattan Postal Station Vehicle Maintenance Facility: Environmental Impact Statement
- Edwards and Kelcey Engineers (1989), Manhattan General Mail Facility: Environmental Impact Statement, vol. 1
- Edwards and Kelcey Engineers (1989), Manhattan General Mail Facility: Environmental Impact Statement, vol. 2: Appendix
- Fitzpatrick, Kevin C. (April 20, 2017), World War I New York: A Guide to the City's Enduring Ties to The Great War, Globe Pequot Press, ISBN 978-1-4930-2804-7
- "Frank L. Dowling, William L. Kavanagh, Frank J. Goodwin, 1926", Culture Now
- Gelb, Yigal; Delacretaz, Nicole (2009), "Windows and Vegetation: Primary Factors in Manhattan Bird Collisions", Northeastern Naturalist, 16 (3), Eagle Hill Institute: 455–470, doi:10.1656/045.016.n312, JSTOR 27744581, S2CID 86509221
- "GIVES TWO GATES TO CITY.; Third District Tammany Club Unveils Portals in Chelsea Park" (PDF). The New York Times. October 18, 1926. ISSN 0362-4331.
- "Health Center On West Side To Be Opened" (PDF). New York Daily Worker. July 12, 1937. p. 5 – via Fultonhistory.com.
- "Health Centre to Cost $175,000" (PDF). The New York Times. August 9, 1935. ISSN 0362-4331.
- "MAYOR BARS PRAISE FOR HEALTH CENTER; Shifts Credit to Roosevelt at Dedication of Building in Chelsea Park" (PDF). The New York Times. July 14, 1937.
- "MAYOR REDEDICATES CHELSEA PLAYGROUND; Neighborhood Is Decorated as Reconstructed Park Opens" (PDF). The New York Times. June 7, 1940.
- "NEW PLAY CENTER UP TO BOARD TODAY; Bronx Project Is First of Eight Planned for Four Boroughs in $7,600,000 Program REST TO WAIT FOR FUNDS Developments Will Provide Year-Round Recreation for Congested Districts" (PDF). The New York Times. July 21, 1949.
- Noland, Jean-Daniel; Levin, Anna Hayes; Compton, J. Lee; Kotler, Lynn (December 14, 2007), Expanded Moynihan/Penn Station Redevelopment Project - Comments on the Draft Scope of Work for the Supplemental Environmental Impact Statement (PDF), City of New York
- Oser, Alan S. (September 18, 1988). "Perspectives: Land Use; Postal Trucks Find a Home on 11th Ave". The New York Times.
- P.O. David Willis Basketball Court, NYC Parks
- "Postal Annex Swept By Fire, 1,800 Flee; 1,800 Evacuated as Blaze Sweeps a Major Postal Station on the West Side" (PDF). The New York Times. December 18, 1967.
- Rajamani, Maya (August 23, 2016), Chelsea Park Handball Courts Reopen After Renovation, DNAinfo, archived from the original on November 7, 2017
- Seewagen, Chad L. (2008), "Lipid Content of Nearctic-Neotropical Migratory Passerines Killed during Stopovers in a New York City Park", Northeastern Naturalist, 15 (1), Eagle Hill Institute: 87–96, doi:10.1656/1092-6194(2008)15[87:LCONMP]2.0.CO;2, JSTOR 25177085, S2CID 55248788
- "TANK CRASH CAUSES CHELSEA PARK PANIC; Two Boys Badly Hurt -- Water Drenches Scores of Women and Children Near By. 20,000 GALLONS IN FLOOD Mothers Missing Youngsters Are in Hysteria at Hearing Roar of Collapse. CRIMINAL INQUIRY STARTED Tank Was Attached by Girders to Brick of Old Eighth Regiment Armory Building" (PDF). The New York Times. August 18, 1925.
- "To Hasten Chelsea Park" (PDF). The New York Times. June 30, 1906. ISSN 0362-4331.
- Wingate, Jennifer (Summer 2005), "Over the Top: The Doughboy in World War I Memorials and Visual Culture", American Art, 19 (2), The University of Chicago Press on behalf of the Smithsonian American Art Museum: 26–47, doi:10.1086/444480, JSTOR 10.1086/444480, S2CID 160892950
