= Vancouver Symphony Orchestra =

Canadian orchestra

- Orchestra
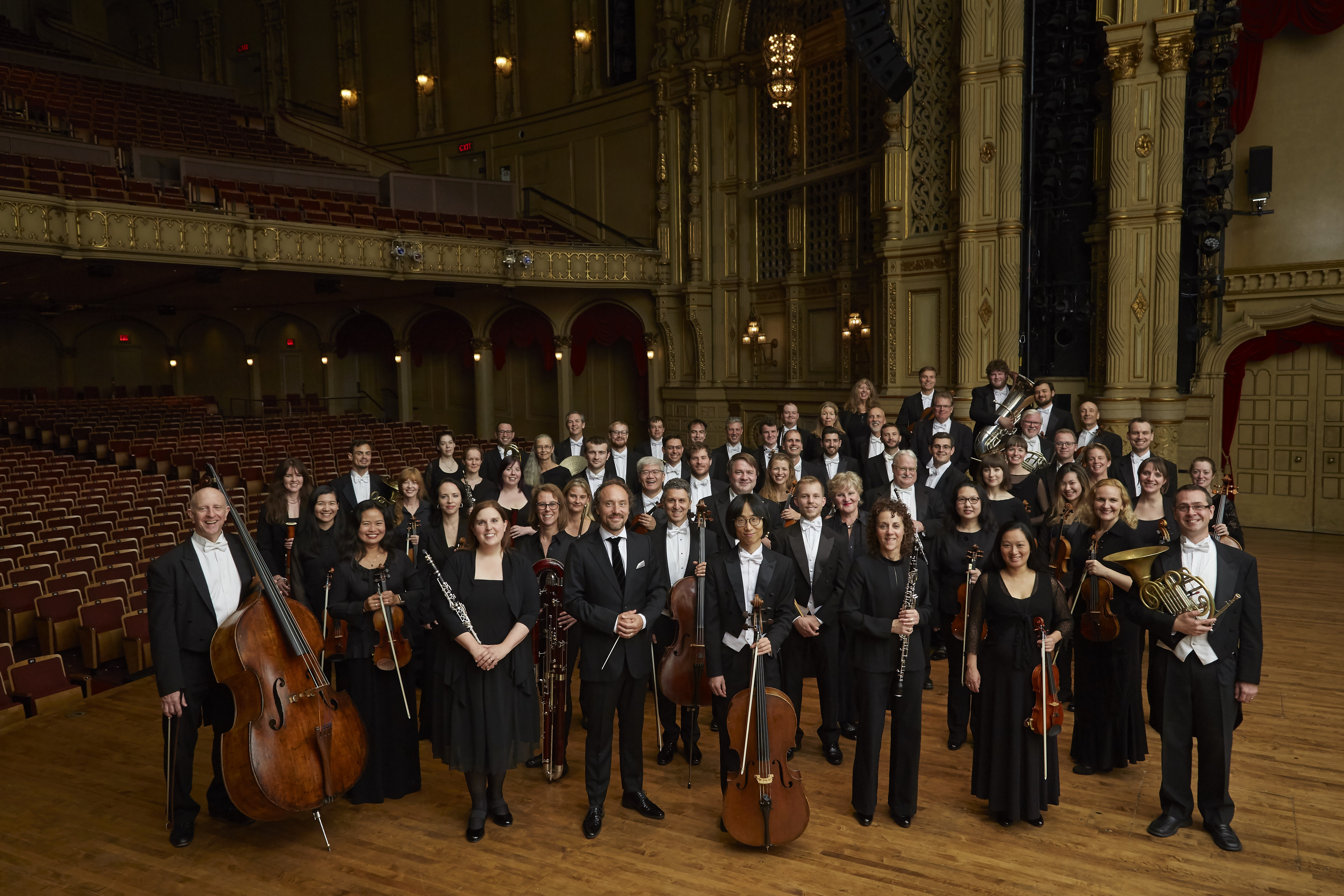
- The Vancouver Symphony Orchestra with Otto Tausk in 2019
- Founded: 1919; 107 years ago
- Concert hall: Orpheum
- Music director: Otto Tausk
- Website: www.vancouversymphony.ca

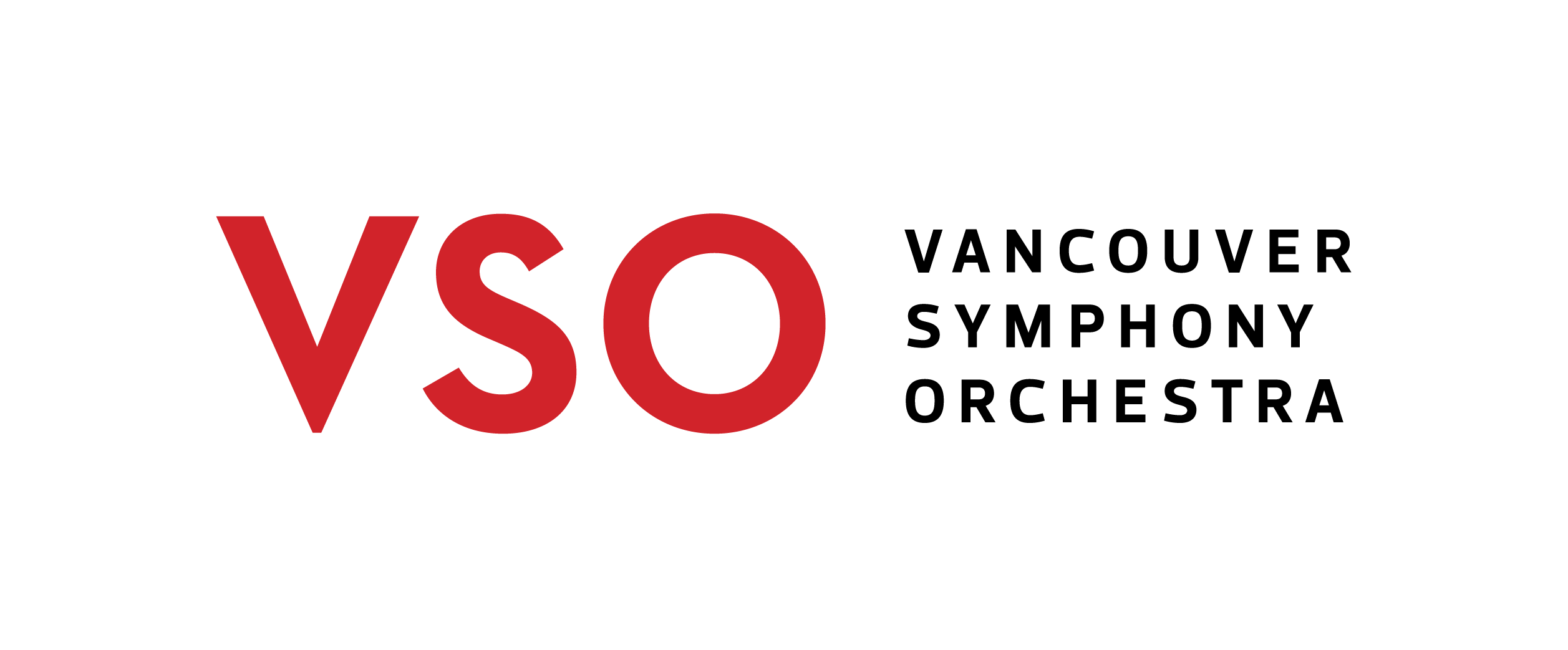
Official Vancouver Symphony Orchestra logo

The Vancouver Symphony Orchestra (VSO) is a Canadian orchestra based in Vancouver, British Columbia. The VSO performs at the Orpheum, which has been the orchestra's permanent home since 1977. With an annual operating budget of $16 million, it is the third largest symphony orchestra in Canada and the largest performing arts organization in Western Canada. It performs 140 concerts per season. The VSO broadcasts annually on the Canadian Broadcasting Corporation. The orchestra is affiliated with the VSO School of Music, which was established in September 2011. Chamber music concerts by VSO musicians take place at Pyatt Hall on the VSO School of Music campus.

== Legal dispute involving Esther Hwang ==
In 2025, the Vancouver Symphony Orchestra drew widespread media attention after it sent a cease-and-desist letter to violinist Esther Hwang, who had spoken publicly about a confidentiality agreement she signed with the orchestra related to a past sexual-assault complaint against a senior member of the ensemble. The letter, issued shortly after coverage in The Globe and Mail, cited alleged breaches of the agreement and stated that the VSO reserved the right to pursue legal action to enforce it. The orchestra stated that it had taken Hwang’s original allegations seriously, retained external investigators, and that the investigators found no evidence to substantiate claims of retaliation, and it denied that retaliation occurred. The situation prompted public backlash, including an online petition calling on the orchestra to refrain from legal action and to end its use of confidentiality agreements in cases of harassment and discrimination.

== History ==
The current VSO was founded by the Vancouver Symphony Society in 1919, largely through the efforts of arts patron Elisabeth (Mrs. B.T.) Rogers. There was an earlier but unrelated orchestra using the same name was formed in 1897 by Adolf Gregory, but lasted for only one season; it was briefly revived in 1907 by Charles Ward. The VSO's first conductor was Henry Green; F.L. Beecher was the first president and Rogers the first vice-president. After two seasons, the orchestra disbanded in 1921 for financial reasons and after Green left. Performances resumed in 1930, again largely because of Rogers, with Allard de Ridder as music director. From the 1940s until 1959, the orchestra performed at the Georgia Auditorium; it then moved to the new Queen Elizabeth Theatre.

The VSO also served as the Vancouver Opera company's orchestra during the 1960s and 1970s, until the creation of the separate Vancouver Opera Orchestra in 1977. During the late 1960s and 1970s, the orchestra often appeared in joint concerts with the Vancouver Woodwind Quintet. Kazuyoshi Akiyama was music director from 1972 to 1985, and then became the orchestra's conductor laureate.

In 1979–1980, the VSO had the largest subscription list of any symphony in North America. However, in spite of a CBC recording contract, a quarterly magazine and an ambitious touring schedule, the VSO began to encounter financial difficulties. In 1988, it was forced to shut down for five months to regroup and deal with a $2.3 million deficit. With creditors forgiving the debt, the VSO began to rebuild. The orchestra began an annual series of outdoor summer concerts and in 1996 appointed their first composer in residence.

From 2000 to 2018, the VSO's Music Director was Bramwell Tovey. His initial contract was extended in December 2004 through the 2009–2010 season, and further extended in January 2010 through the 2014–2015 season. They played during the opening and closing ceremonies of the 2010 Winter Olympics. In November 2013, the VSO announced the further extension of Tovey's contract through the 2017–2018 season, and the scheduled conclusion of his music directorship of the VSO at that time. Tovey took the title of VSO Music Director Emeritus with the 2018–2019 season, the VSO's 100th season, and held the title until his death in July 2022. The VSO and Tovey won the 2008 Grammy Award for Best Instrumental Soloist Performance (with Orchestra), for their recording of the Korngold, Barber, and Walton violin concerti, featuring Canadian violinist James Ehnes. The recording won a 2008 Juno Award for Classical Album of the Year (large ensemble).

In January 2016, Otto Tausk first guest-conducted the VSO. He returned for a second guest-conducting appearance in January 2017. In February 2017, the VSO named Otto Tausk its next music director, starting on July 1, 2018. He held the title of Music Director-Designate for the 2017–2018 season. In September 2020, the VSO announced the extension of Tausk's contract as music director through the 2025–2026 season. In June 2024, the VSO announced a further extension of Tausk's contract as music director through the 2029-2030 season.

== Music directors ==
- Allard de Ridder (1930–1941)
- Jacques Singer (1947–1950)
- Irwin Hoffman (1952–1963)
- Meredith Davies (1964–1970)
- Kazuyoshi Akiyama (1972–1985)
- Rudolf Barshai (1985–1988)
- Sergiu Comissiona (1991–2000)
- Bramwell Tovey (2000–2018)
- Otto Tausk (2018–present)

== Composers in residence ==
- Rodney Sharman (1997–2000)
- Jeffrey Ryan (2000–2007)
- Scott Good (2008–2011)
- Edward Top (2011–2014)
- Jocelyn Morlock (2014–2019)

== Presidents and managers ==
- Victor White (1963–1972)
- Michael Allerton (1972–1985) (Orchestra Manager)
- John Smith (1985–1986) (Interim General Manager)
- Ed Oscapella (1986–1989)
- Diane Hoar (1989–1992)
- Graeme Page (1992–1993)
- Howard Jang (1993–1995)
- Ron Dumouchelle (1995–2000)
- Jeff Alexander (2000–2014)
- Kelly Tweeddale (2015–2019)
- Angela Elster (2020–present)

== Recordings ==
- Open Heart Symphony, a live album recorded by the VSO in collaboration with the folk rock band Spirit of the West.
- Jann Arden Live with the Vancouver Symphony Orchestra a live album recorded in collaboration with pop singer Jann Arden.
- Barber, Korngold, Walton, Violin Concertos, Soloist James Ehnes, Vancouver Symphony Orchestra, Bramwell Tovey, Grammy Awards winner 2008, Juno Awards winner 2008.

== See also ==
- Vancouver Youth Symphony Orchestra
