= Koen Kessels =

Belgian conductor and pianist

- Born: 1961
- Occupations: Conductor, music director
- Known for: Music director of The Royal Ballet and of Dutch National Ballet

Koen Kessels (born 1961) is a Belgian conductor and pianist. He is music director of The Royal Ballet and of Het Balletorkest, affiliated with the Dutch National Ballet.

== Biography ==
Trained as a pianist, Kessels studied at the Royal Conservatoire of Antwerp. He became a repetiteur and an assistant conductor at the Vlaamse Opera. He founded the music ensemble HERMES in 1998 and continues to serve as its artistic director. He has served as music director for the Belgian summer opera festival Zomeropera Alden Biesen.

Kessels became music director of Birmingham Royal Ballet in 2010. In 2015, he became music director of The Royal Ballet. In December 2023, Dutch National Ballet announced the appointment of Kessels as its next music director, which includes the posts of artistic director and chief conductor of Het Balletorkest, effective 1 August 2024. Kessels concluded his tenure as music director of Birmingham Royal Ballet on 30 June 2024.

Kessels is an honorary professor at Birmingham University, as well as artistic director of Inspiratum. He is also on staff of the Royal Conservatoire of Antwerp.

Cultural offices
Preceded by Barry Wordsworth	Music Director, Birmingham Royal Ballet; 2010–2024	Succeeded by Paul Murphy
Preceded by Barry Wordsworth	Music Director, The Royal Ballet; 2015–present	Succeeded by incumbent
Preceded by Matthew Rowe	Music Director, Het Balletorkest; 2024–present	Succeeded by incumbent
