= Het Balletorkest =

Dutch symphony orchestra

Het Balletorkest (literal translation, The Ballet Orchestra) is a Dutch symphony orchestra, based in Amsterdam, Netherlands, affiliated with Het Nationale Ballet and the Nederlands Dans Theater.

== History ==
In 1965, the Nederlands Balletorkest (Netherlands Ballet Orchestra) was established as the resident orchestra for Het Nationale Ballet (Dutch National Ballet) and the Nederlands Dans Theater (Netherlands Dance Theatre). Its chief conductors included Jan Stulen, Lucas Vis, Roelof van Driesten, Thierry Fischer, and Jeppe Moulijn.

On 1 January 2002, the Nederlands Balletorkest took on the new name of the Holland Symfonia. The orchestra had administrative offices in both Haarlem and Amsterdam. The Holland Symfonia had been established after a merger of the Dutch National Ballet Orchestra and the North Holland Philharmonic Orchestra. The orchestra primarily gave symphonic concerts at the Philharmonie Haarlem, and continued as the principal orchestra for Dutch National Ballet at the Dutch National Opera & Ballet in Amsterdam. The orchestra also accompanied touring opera productions in various cities by the Nederlandse Reisopera. The orchestra numbered about 120 regular players, but due to major cuts in subsidies this number was reduced to 45 in 2013. In addition to its symphonic concerts in its home base city of Amsterdam, the orchestra performed in several other Dutch cities such as Alkmaar, Haarlem, Leiden, and Hoorn. It also collaborated in ballet/dance productions in many cities. Under the name of the Holland Symfonia, Roy Goodman was the orchestra's chief conductor from 2004 to 2006. From 2007 to 2012, Otto Tausk was chief conductor of the orchestra.

In 2014, at the behest of Dutch Minister of Culture Jet Bussemaker, the orchestra was further renamed Het Balletorkest, indicative of its reduced tasks and new primary focus on ballet. Existing now as primarily the ballet orchestra for the Dutch National Opera and Ballet, its current conductor is Matthew Rowe, since 2014. Rowe is scheduled to stand down as chief conductor in July 2024. In December 2023, the orchestra announced the appointment of Koen Kessels as its next chief conductor and artistic leader, effective 1 August 2024.

The orchestra has commercially recorded for the Cobra label, including the CD "Dutch Sessions".

== Chief conductors ==
Nederlands Balletorkest:

- Jan Stulen (1970-1976)
- Lucas Vis (1976-1979)
- Roelof van Driesten (1986-1995)
- Thierry Fischer (1997-2001)
- Jeppe Moulijn (2001-2003)

Holland Symfonia:

- Roy Goodman (2004-2006)
- Otto Tausk (2007–2012)

Het Balletorkest:

- Matthew Rowe (2014–2024)
- Koen Kessels (2024–present)
