= Pyatt Hall =

Concert hall in Vancouver, Canada

Coordinates: 49.28031°N 123.11974°W

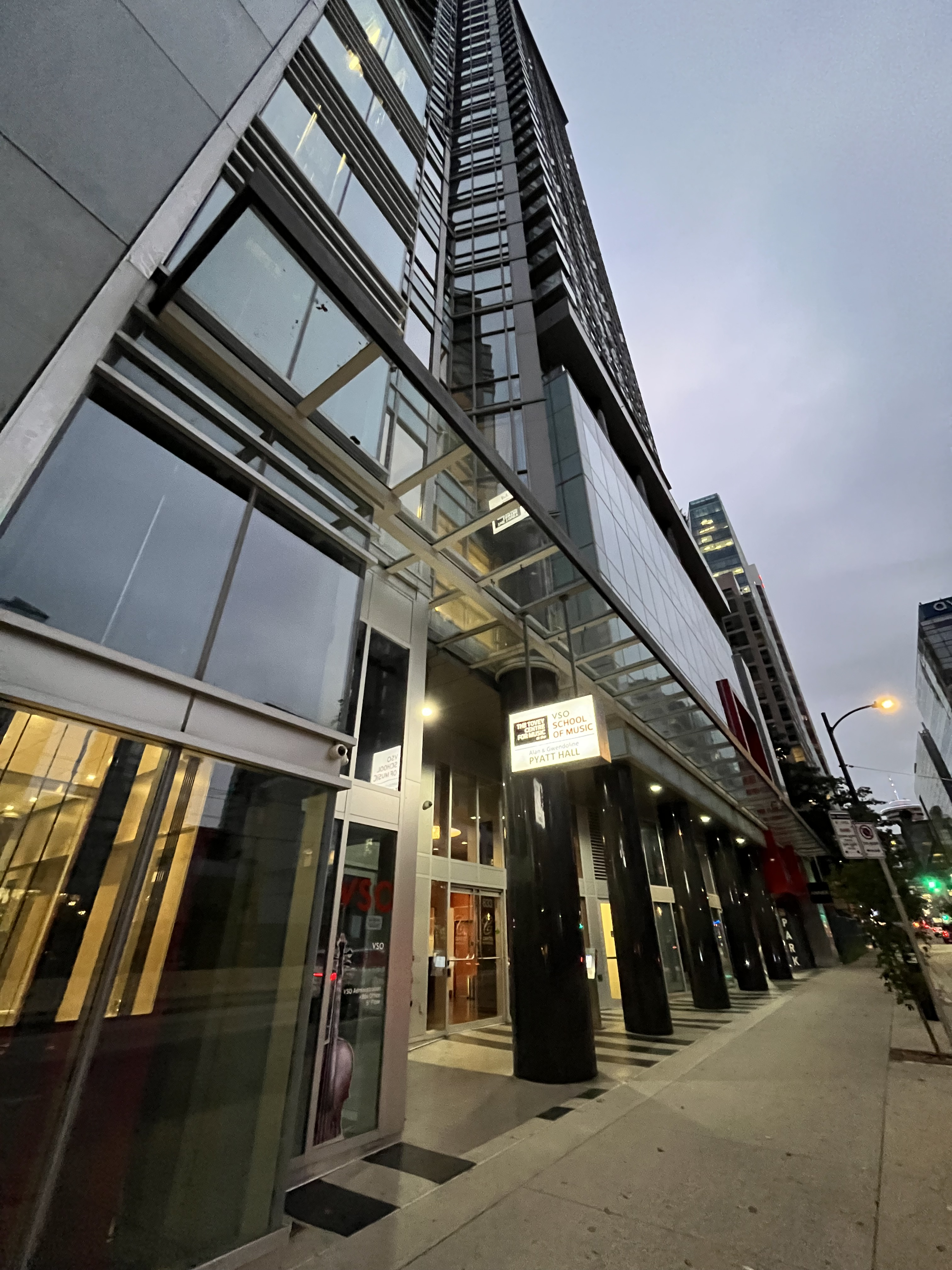
Pyatt Hall

Pyatt Hall is a concert hall on Seymour Street, Vancouver, Canada. It is a venue of the Vancouver Symphony Orchestra School of Music. The hall is specially designed for musical purposes with a gala-lifting flooring system and "basalt stone and sound diffusing maple wood slats". It has 130 seats for flat floor performance or lecture seating, 120 seats for raked performance or lecture seating, and 70 seats for catered events around tables.
