= Otto Tausk =

Dutch conductor (born 1970)

Otto Tausk (born October 27, 1970) is a Dutch conductor.

== Biography ==
Born in Utrecht, Tausk was a violin student of Viktor Liberman and István Párkányi. He studied conducting with Jurjen Hempel and Kenneth Montgomery. He continued his music studies with Jonas Aleksa at the Vilnius conservatory.

Tausk was principal conductor of the Ensemble MAE (Maarten Altena Ensemble) from 2001 to 2007. Tausk served as an assistant conductor with the Rotterdam Philharmonic Orchestra from 2004 to 2006. From 2007 to 2012, Tausk was chief conductor of Holland Symfonia, during which time he received the de Olifant prize from the city of Haarlem. In 2012 and 2014, he was jury chairman of the AVRO television program Maestro.

In March 2004, Tausk conducted the posthumous premiere of Protesilaos en Laodamia, an uncompleted opera by Rudolf Escher in a performing version realised by Willem Boogman. His other work related to contemporary music has included conducting the June 2006 premiere of Michel van der Aa's After Life, at De Nederlandse Opera.

Outside of the Netherlands, Tausk became chief conductor of the Sinfonieorchester St. Gallen and the opera of Saint Gallen in 2012. His initial contract, through 2014, was extended to 2018. His work in St. Gallen has included conducting the world premiere of Annas Maske by David Philip Hefti and Alain Claude Sulzer. He stood down from his St. Gallen posts in 2018.

In January 2016, Tausk first guest-conducted the Vancouver Symphony Orchestra (VSO). He returned for a second VSO guest-conducting engagement in January 2017. In February 2017, the VSO named Tausk its next music director, effective 1 July 2018. He held the title of music director-designate for the 2017–2018 season. In September 2020, the VSO announced the extension of Tausk's contract as music director through the 2025–2026 season. In June 2024, the VSO announced a further extension of Tausk's contract as music director through the 2029–2030 season.

In September 2020, Tausk was announced as the first chief conductor of the newly formed Phion, Orkest van Gelderland & Overijssel, which combines Het Gelders Orkest and Orkest van het Oosten. Tausk stood down as chief conductor of Phion in June 2022.

Tausk and his wife have two sons.

Cultural offices
| Preceded by Roy Goodman | Chief Conductor, Holland Symfonia; 2007–2012 | Succeeded by Matthew Rowe |
| Preceded by David Stern | Chief Conductor, Sinfonieorchester St. Gallen; 2012–2018 | Succeeded by Modestas Pitrenas |
| Preceded by (no predecessor) | Chief Conductor, Phion; 2020–2022 | Succeeded by Alexei Ogrintchouk |
