= NIU College of Engineering and Engineering Technology =

Coordinates: 41°56′23.7″N 88°45′45.4″W

- Type: Public; School of Engineering
- Established: 1985
- Parent institution: Northern Illinois University
- Dean: David Grewell
- Location: Engineering Building; 590 Garden Road; DeKalb, Illinois 60115, U.S.
- Website: www.niu.edu/ceet

NIU College of Engineering and Engineering Technology (NIU CEET) was established in 1985 and offers ABET and ATMAE accredited programs in engineering and engineering technology. The college offers degree programs in electrical engineering, mechanical engineering, industrial and systems engineering, engineering technology, and industrial technology.

== History ==
Established in 1985, the NIU College of Engineering and Engineering Technology is the youngest college on the Northern Illinois University (NIU) campus. CEET enrollment has increased every year despite a decrease in national enrollments.

== Departments ==
- Electrical Engineering
- Industrial and Systems Engineering
- Mechanical Engineering
- Technology

== Research ==
CEET faculty are engaged in a broad array of research sponsored by private industry and agencies such as:

- National Science Foundation
- Fermi National Accelerator Laboratory
- Argonne National Laboratory
- National Institute of Standards and Technology
- State of Illinois

Ongoing research addresses issues in Homeland Security, energy and environment, lean manufacturing, active noise and vibration control, supply chain management, biodegradable products, P-20, computational engineering, biomedical engineering, nanoscience, health systems engineering, wireless communications, power electronics, radio frequency, mechatronics, computational fluid dynamics, and more.

== Facilities ==
Engineering Building: The main NIU College of Engineering and Engineering Technology building is designed to teach students concepts in the classroom.

Students also have access to laboratories featuring wind tunnels, a sound-proof acoustics testing chamber, and labs dedicated to work in fields like bio-signal analysis and electrodynamics.

Still Hall and Still Gym: The CEET Department of Technology is housed in the historic Still Hall and Still Gym. Opened in 1928, the buildings were among some of the first built on campus and originally housed a gymnasium, Industrial Arts Laboratories, classrooms, rooms for printing, book binding, metal work and mechanical drawing.

Today the buildings house 13 laboratories for students working on robotics, digital communications, plastics injection molding, pneumatics and hydraulics and rapid prototyping of mechanical parts. The buildings also include workshops for metal working and welding.

Computer Labs: Computer labs are located in each building.

=== Laboratories ===
CEET has 35 laboratories.

- Omron Robotics and Mechatronics Laboratory: In April 2013, the NIU College of Engineering and Engineering Technology unveiled its new Robotics and Mechatronics Laboratory, paid for and equipped by the Omron Foundation.
- Baxter Reliability Laboratory: The Baxter Reliability Laboratory is equipped to meet thermal, vibration and functional test requirements including a variety of product validation requirements, product robustness testing (HALT), electrical stress testing, and accelerated life testing. Additional Reliability functions provided include thermal analysis, reliability prediction, and warranty calculations.
- Advanced Research of Materials and Manufacturing Laboratory:

Electrical Engineering

- Biomedical Engineering & Sensor Laboratory
- Digital Communications Laboratory
- Digital Signal Processing Laboratory
- General Computer Laboratory
- Electrodynamics Laboratory
- Integrated Circuit Design Laboratory
- Microelectronics Research & Development Laboratory
- Microwaves and Electromagnetics Laboratory
- Robotics and Intelligent Systems Laboratory
- Electrical Engineering Design Laboratory
- Undergraduate Laboratory

Industrial & Systems Engineering

- Ergonomics (Human Factors) Laboratory
- Lean Manufacturing Laboratory
- Logistics Laboratory
- Baxter Reliability Laboratory

Mechanical Engineering

- Advanced Research of Materials and Manufacturing Laboratory
- CAD/CAM Simulation and Fabrication Laboratory
- Omron Robotics & Mechatronics Laboratory
- Fluid Dynamics Laboratory
- Heat & Mass Transfer Laboratory
- Materials Analysis Laboratory
- Vibrations & Controls Laboratory
- Computerized Data Acquisition and Laboratory
- Macro/Micro Manufacturing Laboratory

Technology

- Automation/PLC Computer
- Digital and Communications Systems
- Fluid Power
- General Purpose Electronics
- Machining Technology
- Metrology
- Numerical Machining Laboratory (CNC)
- Plastics
- Power Systems Lab
- Prototyping
- Welding and Joining

== Rankings ==
The NIU College of Engineering and Engineering Technology is ranked 46th in the nation for public engineering institutions where master's degrees are the highest degree offered (US News and World Report).
