= Hans Gruber (conductor) =

- Born: 11 July 1925; Vienna, Austria
- Died: 6 August 2001 (aged 76); Newmarket, Ontario
- Occupation: Conductor

Hans Gruber (11 July 1925 – 6 August 2001) was a Canadian conductor of Austrian birth.

Born in Vienna, Gruber became a naturalised Canadian citizen in 1944. He entered The Royal Conservatory of Music in 1939 where he was a conducting student of Allard de Ridder. He also studied conducting in the summers at the Tanglewood Music Center from 1943-1947 with such teachers as Fritz Mahler, Leonard Bernstein, and Pierre Monteux. In 1948 he succeeded Melvin Knudsen as the conductor of the Victoria Symphony, a post he held until 1963. He also served on the music faculty of the University of Toronto for several years where he notably conducted the school's symphony orchestra.
