= NIU College of Business =

Northern Illinois University unit

Coordinates: 41°56′29.4″N 88°45′44.8″W

- Type: Public; Business school
- Established: 1961
- Affiliations: Northern Illinois University
- Dean: Balaji Rajagopalan
- Location: Barsema Hall; 740 Garden Road; DeKalb, Illinois 60115, U.S.
- Website: NIU College of Business

NIU College of Business (NIU COB) was established in 1961.

== History ==
In 1951, the Business Department was formed at Northern Illinois University (NIU). Originally housed in the former WWII barracks, located on the corner of Lucinda and Garden Road, the three faculty members of the new Business Department taught 11 business courses to their 43 business students.

Dr. Francis Geigle, as the first chair of the department, would see the Business Department outgrow the barracks, moving first to Altgeld Hall and then to McMurry Hall by the end of the decade.

During the next decade the Business Department became the NIU College of Business and moved to its new home in Wirtz Hall.

Barsema Hall was built in 2002.

== Departments ==
- Accountancy
- Business Administration
- Finance
- Management
- Marketing
- Operations Management and Information Systems

== Facilities ==
Barsema Hall located on the Northern Illinois University Campus is the home of the NIU College of Business. Completed in 2002, the building is named after Dennis and Stacey Barsema, whose private donation allowed the construction of the new business building.

The 144,000 square foot facility combines classrooms, computer labs, a 375-seat auditorium, specialized labs, faculty and staff offices, and spaces for studying, meeting, and even eating. The core of the building contains a large atrium space complete with a cafe.
