= Allard de Ridder =

Dutch–Canadian conductor, violist and composer (1887–1966)

Allard de Ridder (3 May 1887 – 13 May 1966) was a Dutch–Canadian conductor, violist, and composer. He was notably the first conductor of both the Vancouver Symphony Orchestra and the Ottawa Symphony Orchestra, the latter of which he founded in 1944. As a composer he produced several orchestral works, including a violin concerto, four symphonic poems, a Sketch for flute, violin, and orchestra, Overture in D, and Intermezzo. He also wrote a string quartet, the scherzo Beware of Love for a cappella choir, and a number of songs.

== Early life and career in Europe and the United States ==
De Ridder was born in Dordrecht, Netherlands, as the son of Eudia Lina Pierson and Willem de Ridder, banker, cellist and president of the Dordrecht Music Society. From 1899 he studied violin in The Hague with Carl Bayer, and between 1903 and 1909 he studied violin and conducting at the Cologne University of Music under Fritz Steinbach and Hermann Abendroth. His conducting career started in Arnhem. Here Willem Mengelberg saw him and was so impressed that he invited him to be guest conductor with his Concertgebouw Orchestra in Amsterdam. He later conducted the Residentie Orchestra in The Hague, where he took composition lessons from Johan Wagenaar. He was conductor of the Netherlands National Opera (Nederlandsche Opera) from 1917 to 1919. In April 1918 in Amsterdam, he married Pauline E.E. Mendelssohn-Bartholdy (grand-niece of the famous composer), whom he had met in Cologne.

In 1919 De Ridder emigrated with his wife to the United States where he first worked as a violist in the Boston Symphony Orchestra and then the Richmond Symphony. In the early 1920s he became assistant conductor and principal violist of the Los Angeles Philharmonic (LAP). Many of his orchestral compositions were premiered by American orchestras like the LAP during the 1920s.

== Life and career in Canada ==
De Ridder was appointed the first conductor of the Vancouver Symphony Orchestra in 1930, a post he held until 1941. Initially the post was part-time, as the orchestra performed only four concerts annually during its first three seasons. However, in 1933 Ridder moved to Vancouver as the orchestra's concert offerings began to expand significantly. Shortly after moving to that city he formed the chamber group the Allard de Ridder Chamber Music Quartette which he actively directed and performed with during the 1930s. In 1934 he established a summer concert series for the VSO at the newly built Malkin Bowl in Stanley Park, a venue which he was instrumental in convincing William Harold Malkin to build. He also worked as a guest lecturer at the University of British Columbia during the late 1930s.

In 1941 De Ridder left Vancouver for Toronto to join the music faculty at the Toronto Conservatory of Music. Shortly after his arrival he joined the Hart House String Quartet. He also served as a guest conductor of the Promenade Symphony Concerts in 1942 and both the Toronto Symphony Orchestra and National Symphony Orchestra in 1943. He left Vancouver in 1944 to found the Ottawa Philharmonic Orchestra (now Ottawa Symphony Orchestra), serving as the group's first conductor through 1950.

In 1952 De Ridder moved back to Vancouver where he remained until he died 13 May 1966. He conducted the Holland Choir in that city during the 1950s, notably leading the group in a performance of his own Variations on a Swabian Folk Song in 1957 with the Vancouver Symphony Orchestra. He continued to teach conducting, viola, and composition in Vancouver up until his death there in 1966 at the age of 79. Among his notable pupils are John Avison, Lloyd Blackman, Bryan N.S. Gooch, Hans Gruber, Klemi Hambourg, Ricky Hyslop, and Doug Randle. See: List of music students by teacher: C to F#Allard de Ridder.
