= NIU College of Visual and Performing Arts =

Art school of Northern Illinois University

Coordinates: 41°56′8.1″N 88°45′38.3″W

- Type: Public; School of Fine Arts
- Established: 1957
- Affiliation: Northern Illinois University
- Dean: Paul Kassel
- Location: Music Building; Northern Illinois University; DeKalb, Illinois 60115, U.S.

NIU College of Visual and Performing Arts is composed of three schools. The college also administers several university programs including, the NIU Art Museum, the NIU Community School of Arts, and NIU Huskie Marching Band.

== Overview ==
The college of Visual and Performing Arts at Northern Illinois University (NIU) is composed of three schools:

- School of Art and Design
- School of Music
- School of Theatre and Dance

== School of Art and Design ==
The NIU School of Art and Design has a faculty of more than 40, and an enrollment of more than 450 undergraduate and 80 graduate students.

=== Undergraduate programs ===
- Art + Design Education
- Art History
- Ceramics
- Drawing
- Sculpture
- Fiber
- Foundations
- Illustration
- Metals
- Museum Studies
- Painting
- Photography
- Printmaking
- Time Arts
- Visual Communication

=== Graduate programs ===
The graduate program in art is comprehensive, leading to specialized areas of study in the fine arts, design and media, art and design education, and art history.

==== Areas of Study ====
- Art + Design Education
- Art History
- Ceramics
- Drawing
- Sculpture
- Fibers
- Metals
- Painting
- Photography
- Printmaking
- Time Arts

==== Master's programs ====
- Master of Arts in art (Studio)
- Master of Arts in art (Art History)
- Master of Fine Arts in Art (Studio)
- Master of Science in art (Art Education)
- Master of Science in art (Art Education, Online)

==== Doctoral programs ====
- Doctor of Philosophy in Art Education
- Specialization in Art and Design Education under the Doctor of Education in Curriculum and Instruction

==== Certificate programs ====
- Certificate of Graduate Study in Art History
- Interdisciplinary Certificate of Graduate Study in Museum Studies

=== Accreditation ===
The NIU School of Art and Design has been a fully accredited institutional member of the National Association of Schools of Art and Design (NASAD) since 1969. All academic programs at NIU are also accredited by the North Central Association of Colleges and Schools (NCA), while programs in education are accredited by the National Council for Accreditation of Teacher Education(NCATE).

== School of Music ==
Students in the School of Music perform in a wide range of ensembles: jazz, orchestra, wind ensemble, choirs, steelband and ensembles devoted to music of Indonesia, China and the Middle East. The school hosts both a New Music Festival and a World Music Festival each year. Students also have the opportunity to study recording arts and take part in Internet2 collaborations.

The NIU School of Music offers a wide variety of performance and academic areas of study for both undergraduate and graduate students.

Program Specialties

- Brass
- Guitar
- History & Literature
- Jazz Studies
- Keyboard
- Music Education
- Percussion and Steel Pan
- Opportunities to study recording arts
- Strings
- Theory & Composition
- Voice
- Woodwinds
- World Music

=== Undergraduate programs ===
The NIU School of Music offers the Bachelor of Music (B.M.) degree with a variety of areas of study (performance, including jazz and steelpan; music education; and composition), as well as a Bachelor of Arts (B.A.) degree.

Bachelor of Arts - The B.A., offered through the NIU College of Visual and Performing Arts, is designed for students who wish to study music in the context of a comprehensive liberal arts experience, immersing themselves in both the practice and theory.

Bachelor of Music - The NIU School of Music offers a Bachelor of Music degree with emphases in music education, performance, and composition.

- Emphasis 1: Music Education - Students admitted to this program select either instrumental or vocal music as an area and concurrently seek Illinois public school educator licensure, leading to careers as school music teachers.
- Emphasis 2: Performance - Students who intend to pursue professional careers as performing musicians select an area of study in keyboard music, vocal music, instrumental music, or jazz studies.
- Emphasis 3: Composition - This program is for students who wish to develop professional careers in composition, or who intend to pursue graduate study in composition/theory after completion of the bachelor's degree.

Educator Licensure - The music education program leads to a K-12 special certificate that authorizes the holder to teach all aspects of music in grades K-12.

=== Graduate programs ===
The NIU School of Music offers the Master of Music (M.M.) degree with a full complement of majors as well as the Performer's Certificate. The school also offers individualized degree programs for graduate students who wish to pursue nontraditional courses of study.

Master of Music - The Master of Music degree if offered in one of three specializations: music education, music performance or individualized study.

- Specialization 1: Music Education
- Specialization 2: Music Performance
- Specialization 3: Individualized Study - Music

Performer's Certificate - The Performer's Certificate is a post-master's certificate program that enables advanced students to attain greater mastery of their chosen fields than they can achieve in formal study through the master's degree level.

=== Accreditation ===
The NIU School of Music is accredited by the National Association of Schools of Music (NASM). All academic programs at NIU are also accredited by the North Central Association of Colleges and Schools (NCA), while programs in education are accredited by the National Council for Accreditation of Teacher Education(NCATE).

== School of Theatre and Dance ==
The NIU School of Theatre and Dance offers several degree programs, including BA in theatre arts, BFA with emphases in acting, design and technology and dance performance, and MFA with specializations in acting and design and technology.

Every year, a select group of students studies for one month at the Moscow Art Theatre School.

=== Undergraduate programs ===
- BA - Theatre Studies
- BFA - Emphasis in Acting
- BFA - Emphasis in Dance
- BFA - Emphasis in Design and Technology

=== Graduate programs ===
- MFA - Specialization in Acting
- MFA - Specialization in Design and Technology
- MFA - Emphasis in Costume Design
- MFA - Emphasis in Lighting Design
- MFA - Emphasis in Scenery Design
- MFA - Emphasis in Theatre Technology

=== Facilities ===
The NIU School of Theatre and Dance is housed in the Stevens Building. The building includes the school's principal theatre production spaces, which include the O'Connell Theatre, a fully equipped 440-seat proscenium theatre; 220 seat Players Theatre, a smaller, flexible "black box" theatre space; and Corner Theatre, a 150-seat open stage workshop.

The scene shop contains all major wood and metal working tools, including a remotely located industrial pneumatic compressor for use in construction, painting and stage mechanics. In addition to the lighting workshop, a specialized laboratory accommodates experimental projects in lighting and scenic design. This facility is complemented by two additional specialized design and technical classrooms and drafting laboratories. A computer graphics laboratory is accessible to design and technology students.

=== Accreditation ===
The NIU School of Theatre and Dance is a member of the University Resident Theatre Association, and its programs are accredited by the National Association of Schools of Theatre (NAST). All academic programs at NIU are also accredited by the North Central Association of Colleges and Schools (NCA), while programs in education are accredited by the National Council for Accreditation of Teacher Education (NCATE).

== Other programs ==
=== Art Museum ===
The NIU Art Museum originated in the NIU School of Art during the 1960s as an exhibition center curated by the faculty. In 1970, Gallery 200 was established as a permanent exhibition space within the newly constructed art building. In 1979, the Art Gallery moved to larger quarters in Swen Parson Hall and began to acquire a permanent collection. In 1990, the Swen Parson Art Gallery became a separate academic unit within the College of Visual and Performing Arts and its name was changed from "gallery" to "museum" to reflect its growing permanent collection. In 1991, the NIU Art Museum moved into the 5000 square-foot former auditorium in historic Altgeld Hall. This space was closed in December 1998 as Altgeld Hall was prepared to undergo a major renovation project. The Art Museum reopened in 2004 in the remodeled Altgeld Galleries.

During the renovation, the NIU Art Museum offices moved to a temporary site off campus where the Museum staff oversaw its Museum without Walls program. While its main gallery was closed, the Art Museum collaborated with artists and local community ‘Partners in Art’ in the development, design and production of contemporary art installations, events and projects at various locations within the greater DeKalb area.

The NIU Chicago Gallery was founded in 1985 as an outreach unit located in Chicago's River North gallery district. In this space, the Museum presented contemporary conceptual and installation art as well as the work of NIU faculty and students. In June 2006, facing tightening state funds, the Museum and University administration closed the NIU Chicago Gallery and reallocated resources supporting that space to the college.

The Jack Olson Memorial Gallery (formerly Gallery 200) generally shows two professional art exhibitions per year and six student group art exhibitions. The Gallery was renamed in 1996 to honor art professor and past gallery director Charles “Jack” Olson who taught at NIU from 1969 until 1994. The Olson Gallery was administered by NIU Art Museum staff from 1995 - 2004. Now, the Olson Gallery is run exclusively by the School of Art at NIU.

=== Community School of Arts ===
The NIU Community School of the Arts is an outreach program of the NIU of Visual and Performing Arts.

=== Huskie Marching Band ===
The NIU Huskie Marching Band performs at all university home football games, at select away games, and at post-season bowl games. The band entertains the stadium crowd while both on the field an in the stands. The Huskie Marching Band also entertains crowds at select parades and university events and contributes to the education of members who may become band directors.

==== History ====
In 1899, fourteen men gathered under the direction of Calvin Dart with horns and drums in hand to form what eventually became the NIU Huskie Marching Band.
