= Northern Illinois University =

Public university in DeKalb, Illinois, US

Coordinates: 41°56′2″N 88°46′40″W

- Former names: Northern Illinois State School (1895–1921); Northern Illinois State Teachers College (1921–1955); Northern Illinois State College (1955–1957)
- Type: Public research university
- Established: May 22, 1895; 131 years ago
- Accreditation: HLC
- Academic affiliations: URA; space-grant
- Endowment: $122.6 million (2025)
- President: Lisa Freeman
- Provost: Laurie Elish-Piper
- Students: 16,078 (fall 2025)
- Undergraduates: 12,118 (fall 2025)
- Postgraduates: 3,960 (fall 2025)
- Location: DeKalb, Illinois, United States
- Campus: University town; 945.13 acres (382.5 ha)
- Colors: Cardinal and black
- Nickname: Huskies
- Sporting affiliations: NCAA Division I — FBS Mountain West; Horizon League
- Website: niu.edu

Northern Illinois University (NIU) is a public research university in DeKalb, Illinois, United States. It was founded as "Northern Illinois State Normal School" in 1895 by Illinois Governor John P. Altgeld, initially to provide the state with college-educated teachers. In addition to the main campus in DeKalb, it has satellite centers in Chicago, Naperville, Rockford, and Oregon, Illinois.

The university is composed of seven degree-granting colleges and has a student body of approximately 16,000. NIU is one of seven public universities in Illinois that compete in NCAA Division I. The athletic teams are known as the Huskies and compete in the Mountain West as a football only member while their remaining teams play in the Horizon League. (Note: NIU's wrestling team competes in the PAC-12 as an affiliate member.)

== History ==
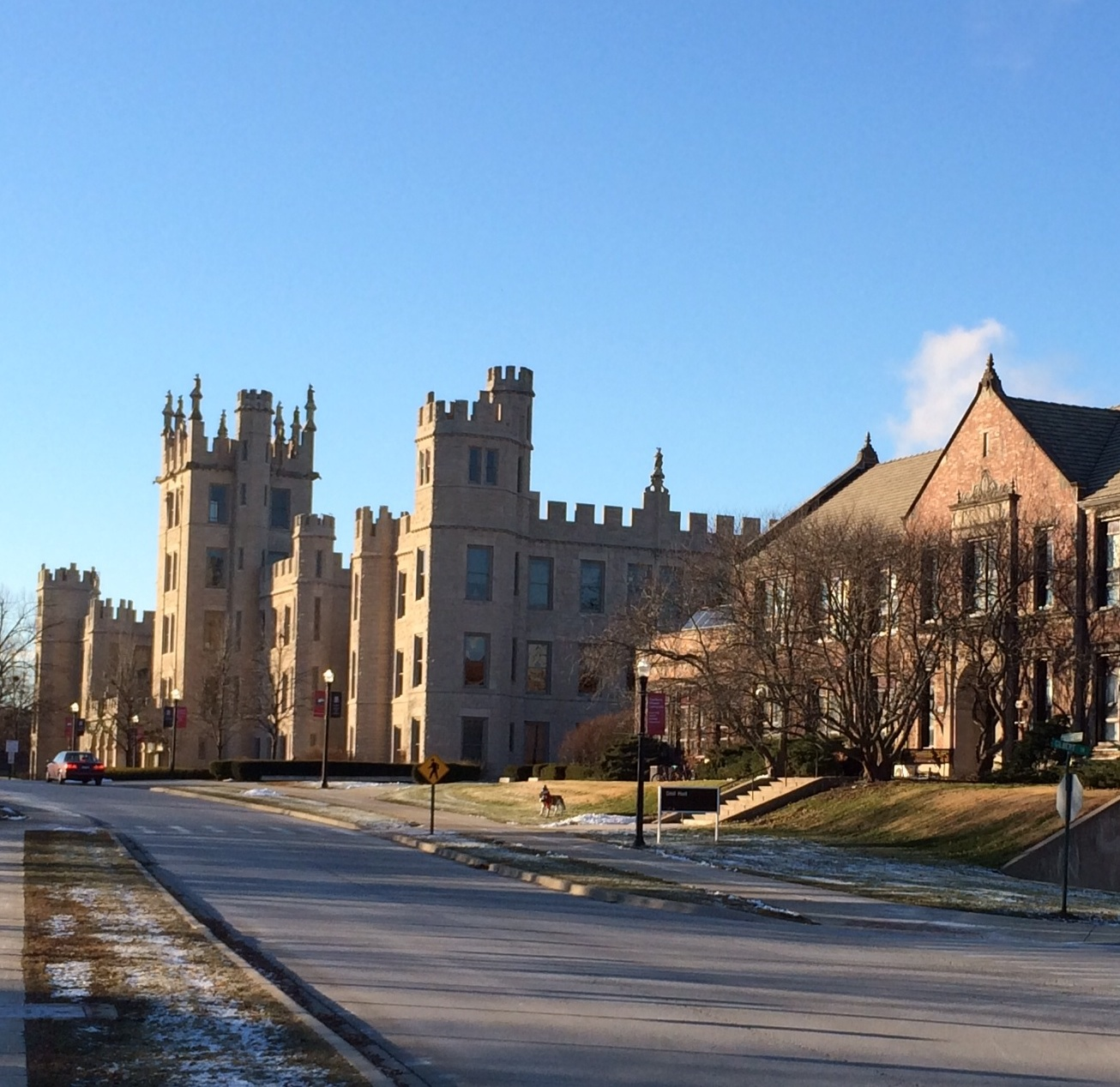
Altgeld Hall and Still Hall along College Avenue. Altgeld Hall was the first building constructed on campus.

Northern Illinois University was founded as part of the expansion of the normal school program established in 1857 in Normal, Illinois. In 1895, the state legislature created a board of trustees for the governance of the Northern Illinois State Normal School, which would grow into what is today known as NIU.

In July 1917, the Illinois Senate consolidated the boards of trustees for the five state normal schools (Eastern Illinois State Normal School, Illinois State Normal School, Northern Illinois State Normal School, Southern Illinois State Normal University, and Western Illinois State Normal School) into one state Normal School Board.

Over the next fifty-eight years, the school and the governing board changed their names several times. In 1921, the legislature gave the institution the name Northern Illinois State Teachers College and empowered it to award the four-year Bachelor of Education degree. In 1941, the Normal School Board changed its name to the Teachers College Board. In 1951, the Teachers College Board authorized the college to grant the degree Master of Science in education, and the institution's Graduate School was established. On July 1, 1955, the state legislature renamed the college Northern Illinois State College and authorized the college to broaden its educational services by offering academic work in areas other than teacher education. The Teachers College Board granted permission for the college to add curricula leading to the degrees Bachelor of Arts and Bachelor of Science. On July 1, 1957, the Seventieth General Assembly renamed Northern Illinois State College as Northern Illinois University in recognition of its expanded status as a liberal arts university.

In 1965, the Illinois State Teachers College Board became the Board of Governors of State Colleges and Universities and was reorganized to include Northeastern University, Governor's State, and Chicago State Universities. In 1967, authority for Northern Illinois University, Illinois State University, and Sangamon State University were passed on to a newly formed board of regents. In 1984, the board created the position of chancellor for the three regent universities to act as a chief executive for all three schools. In 1996, authority for each of the three regency universities was transferred to three independent boards of trustees, each concerned with only one university.

In 2008, the university drew international attention when a gunman, armed with three pistols and a shotgun, opened fire in a crowd of students on campus, killing five students and injuring 17 more people before fatally shooting himself.

=== Presidents ===
Thirteen presidents have served at the university. See above article. Lisa Freeman is the current president and has been in office since 2017 as acting president before being fully appointed in September 2018. She's expected to leave the position in June 2028.

== Campus ==
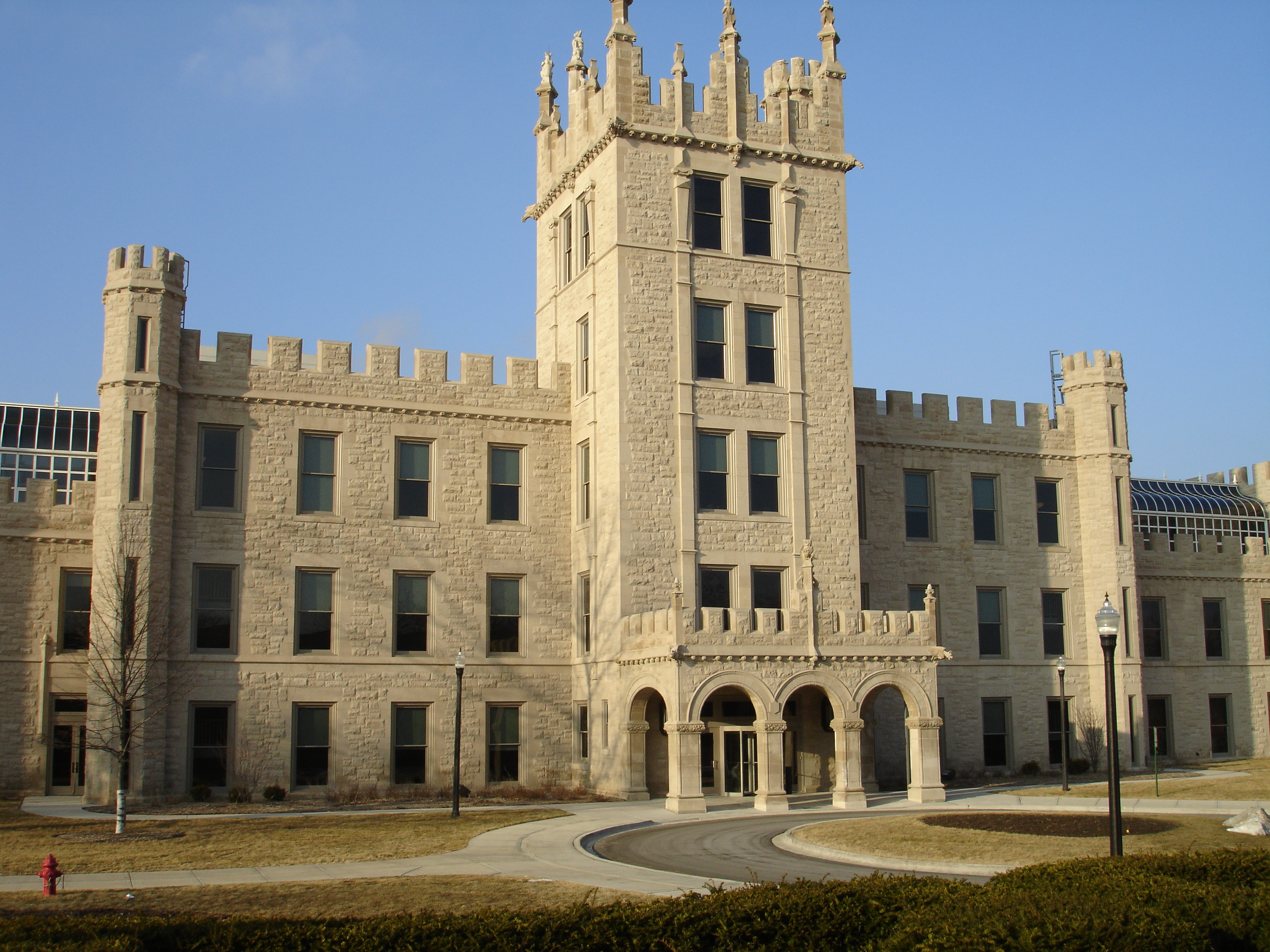
Altgeld Hall

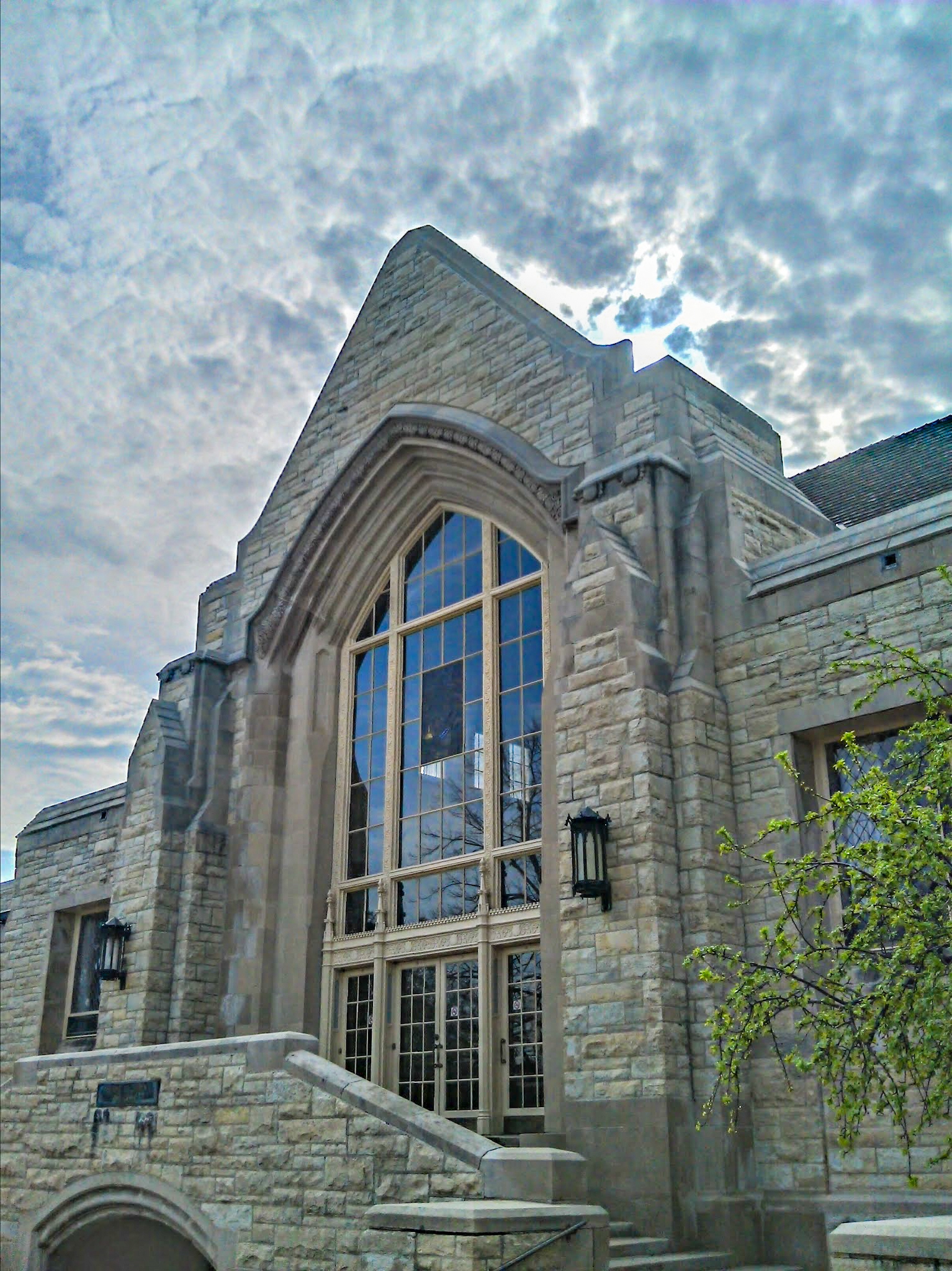
Swen Parson Hall, College of Law

The main campus sits on 756 acres in DeKalb and includes 64 major buildings. Additional campus sites include the Lorado Taft Field Campus (144 acres), Rockford Campus (10 acres), and the Naperville Campus (11.2 acres).

One of the most prominent buildings on campus is the castle-like Altgeld Hall. It is one of the five castle-themed buildings built according to the suggestion of Governor John Peter Altgeld. The auditorium in Altgeld Hall, which was designed to also function as a ballroom, was restored and can seat up to 500. On the level below the auditorium, the original gym was transformed into a computer classroom. Also on the same level is the NIU Art Museum, which occupies two large spaces.

The East Lagoon near Altgeld is a recreation spot on campus. The Holmes Student Center also houses a 78-room hotel.

=== Residence halls ===
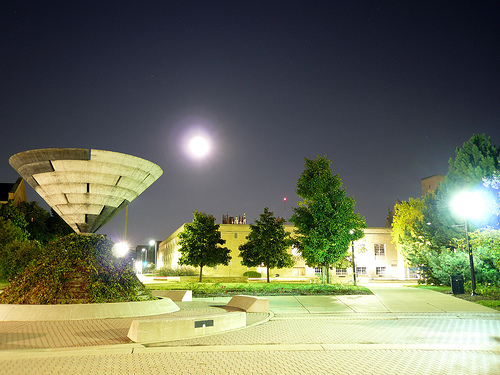
Martin Luther King Commons at night

NIU's residence halls provide several living options to on-campus students. As of 2024, there are six student dormitories and complexes. Living-learning floors include the Health Professions House; Business Careers House; Teacher Education and Certification House; Honors House; International House; Science, Technology, Engineering & Mathematics House; and Fine Arts House.

Northern View Community, which opened in 2008, offers apartments to undergraduate students who are at least two years post-high school, graduate students, law students, or any student who has a dependent and/or a partner or spouse.

The Fanny Ruth Patterson Complex (formerly known as New Hall), a 1,000-bed complex just north of Lincoln Hall, opened to all students in the fall of 2012. It features two residential buildings where students can live in clusters of 12.

=== Athletic facilities ===
On the west side of campus is Brigham Field at Huskie Stadium, the home of NIU football games, which also often hosts other outdoor events. Huskie Stadium, which has a seating capacity over 23,000, is surrounded by large open grassy areas which provide recreation, and also serve as the tailgating lots for football games. There is also a baseball field, Ralph McKinzie Field; a softball field, Mary M. Bell Field; a soccer field, Huskie Soccer Complex; and tennis courts, Gullikson Tennis Courts, which flank Huskie Stadium.

At the stadium's north end zone are two athletic buildings. The first is the Jeffrey and Kimberly Yordon Academic and Athletic Performance Center. The facility opened in August 2007. The second is the Kenneth and Ellen Chessick Indoor Practice Center, an 80,600-square-foot practice facility that houses the football, baseball, and softball teams.

On the far west side of campus is the Convocation Center, a 10,000-seat arena opened in 2002. The Convocation Center hosts NIU men's and women's basketball, gymnastics, wrestling, and volleyball, Victor E. Court, games, the opening convocation ceremony for incoming freshmen, music concerts, and a variety of events throughout the year including job fairs, internship fairs, and other expositions.

At the corner of Annie Glidden Road and Lucinda Avenue is the Chick Evans Field House, home to two large activity rooms with mirrors often used by dance clubs; a three-lane, 1/7-mile jogging and walking track; four multipurpose courts for basketball, volleyball, indoor soccer and floor hockey; and a cardio- and strength-training room, which has been under-used since the basketball team moved to the Convocation Center. The field house continues to host expositions and sporting events of a smaller scale, and is the headquarters for the campus ROTC program.

Two swimming pools are located in Anderson and Gabel Halls.

== Academics ==
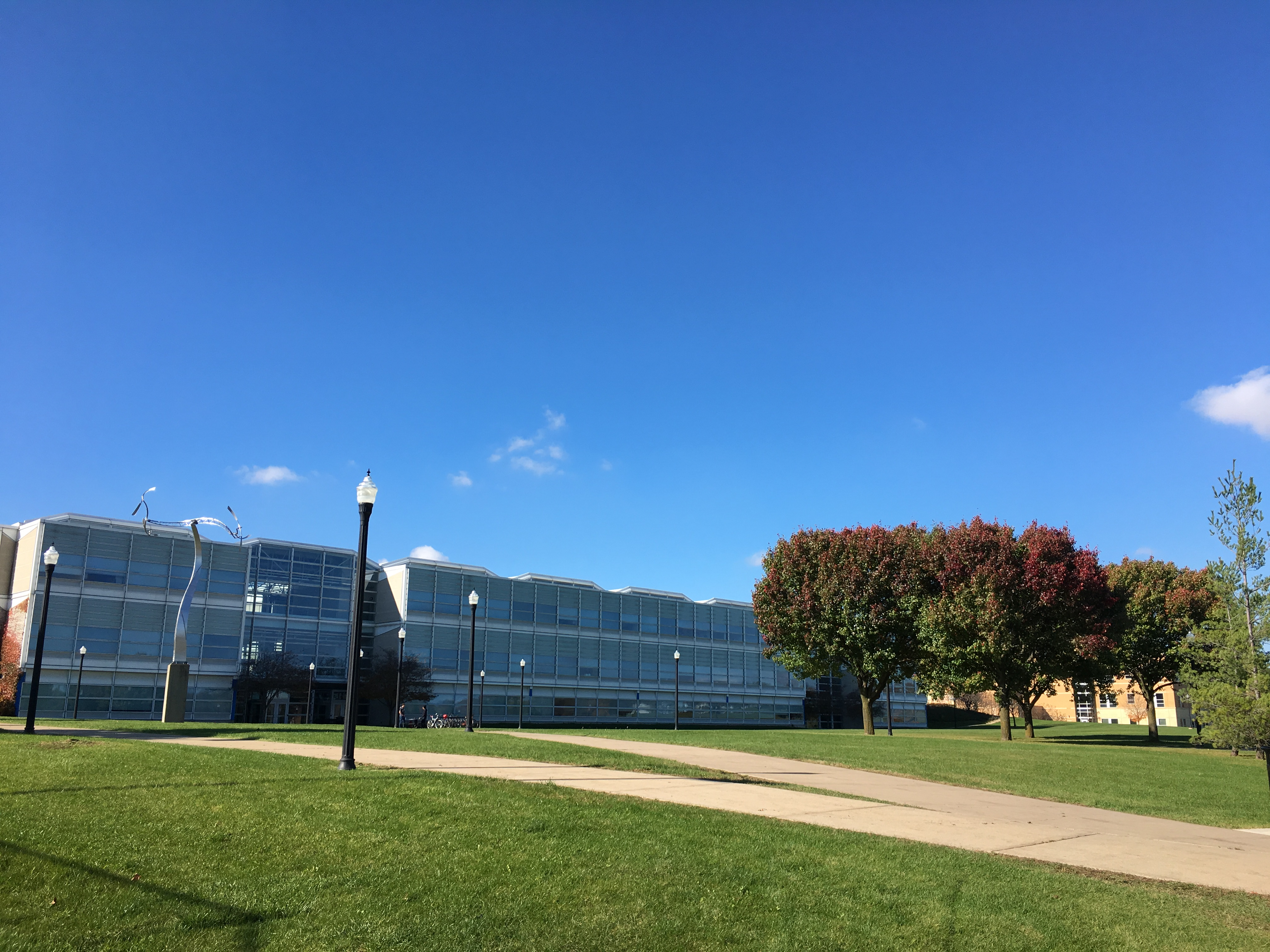
NIU College of Engineering

NIU has seven degree-granting colleges that together offer more than 60 undergraduate majors, 70 minors, nine pre-professional programs, and 79 graduate programs. NIU offers 24 areas of study leading to doctoral degrees.

- College of Business
- College of Education
- College of Engineering and Engineering Technology
- College of Health and Human Sciences
- College of Law
- College of Liberal Arts and Sciences
- College of Visual and Performing Arts

=== Reputation and rankings ===
Academic rankings

National
- Forbes: 339
- U.S. News & World Report: 301 (tie)
- Washington Monthly: 248
- WSJ/College Pulse: 601–800

Global
- U.S. News & World Report: 1195 (tie)

In 2021, Northern Illinois University was ranked the 97th top college in the United States by Payscale and CollegeNet's Social Mobility Index college rankings. In 2024, NIU was classified as a National University by U.S. News & World Report and ranked number 269 out of 339 in the category. The same publication also ranked NIU as 57th best in the country for Public Affairs programs, and within that field, NIU was ranked 4th for Local Government Management and 11th for Public Finance & Budgeting. Forbes magazine placed NIU as number 386 on its list of 600 universities in 2021.

=== Research ===
NIU is classified among "R2: Doctoral Universities – High research activity". The university is also a member of the Universities Research Association that manages several federal physics laboratories including Fermi National Accelerator Laboratory in Batavia, Illinois. The university is expanding its program in accelerator technology.

Established in 1963, Northern Illinois University's Center for Southeast Asian Studies (CSEAS) is currently one of seven federally recognized National Resource Centers (NRC) for Southeast Asian foreign language and area studies. NIU has been awarded the Title VI Foreign Language and Area Studies (FLAS) Fellowships since 1974 and Undergraduate NRC grants since 1997. NIU's CSEAS operates within the College of Liberal Arts and Sciences and offers an undergraduate minor and a graduate concentration in Southeast Asian studies, enrolling more than 1,500 students each year.

== Student life ==
Student body composition as of May 2, 2022
| Race and ethnicity | Total |
|---|---|
| White | 48% |
| Hispanic | 21% |
| Black | 19% |
| Asian | 6% |
| Other (Note: Other consists of Multiracial Americans & those who prefer to not say.) | 4% |
| Foreign national | 1% |
Economic diversity
| Low-income (Note: The percentage of students who received an income-based federal Pell grant intended for low-income students.) | 52% |
| Affluent (Note: The percentage of students who are a part of the American middle class at the bare minimum.) | 48% |

=== Facilities ===
NIU's Campus Child Care Center offers care to children aged two months to five years, along with a summer school program for children ages 6 to 8. Enrollment is secured on a first-come, first-served basis, with priority given first to currently enrolled families, followed by NIU students, NIU faculty and staff, and the community. The center is licensed through the State of Illinois and accredited through the Academy of Early Childhood Program Accreditation.

The Peters Campus Life Building is home to the Campus Activities Board, Career Services, the Counseling and Student Development Center, the Honors Program, the Northern Star student newspaper, the Student Association, and Student Involvement and Leadership Development.

=== Organizations ===
NIU has more than 400 student organizations, including recreational sports clubs such as lacrosse, volleyball, rugby, swimming, and ice hockey. Groups embrace interests from academics, advocacy, athletics and the arts to community service, ethnicity, politics, language studies, and religion. There are dozens of fraternities and sororities.

Each year, several of the Greek organizations at NIU host IFC Tugs, a bracket-style athletic tournament competition similar to tug-of-war with a long history at Northern Illinois University. NIU Tugs was captured on film in a 1996 documentary, Tugs Untied, about NIU's unique version of the sport; the 37-minute documentary won the "Best of Arizona" award at the 2000 Arizona International Film Festival.

=== Arts and culture ===
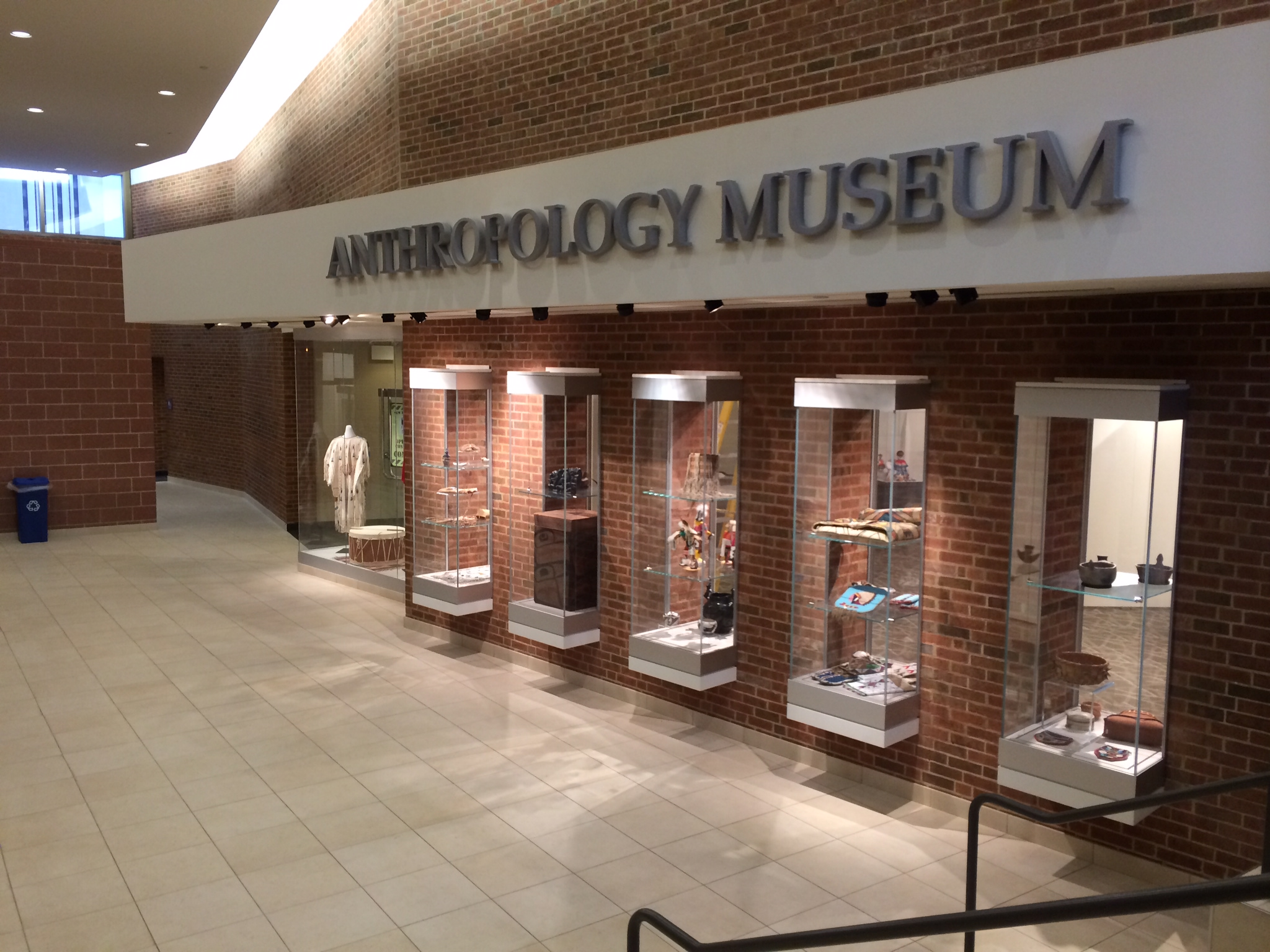
NIU Anthropology Museum in Cole Hall

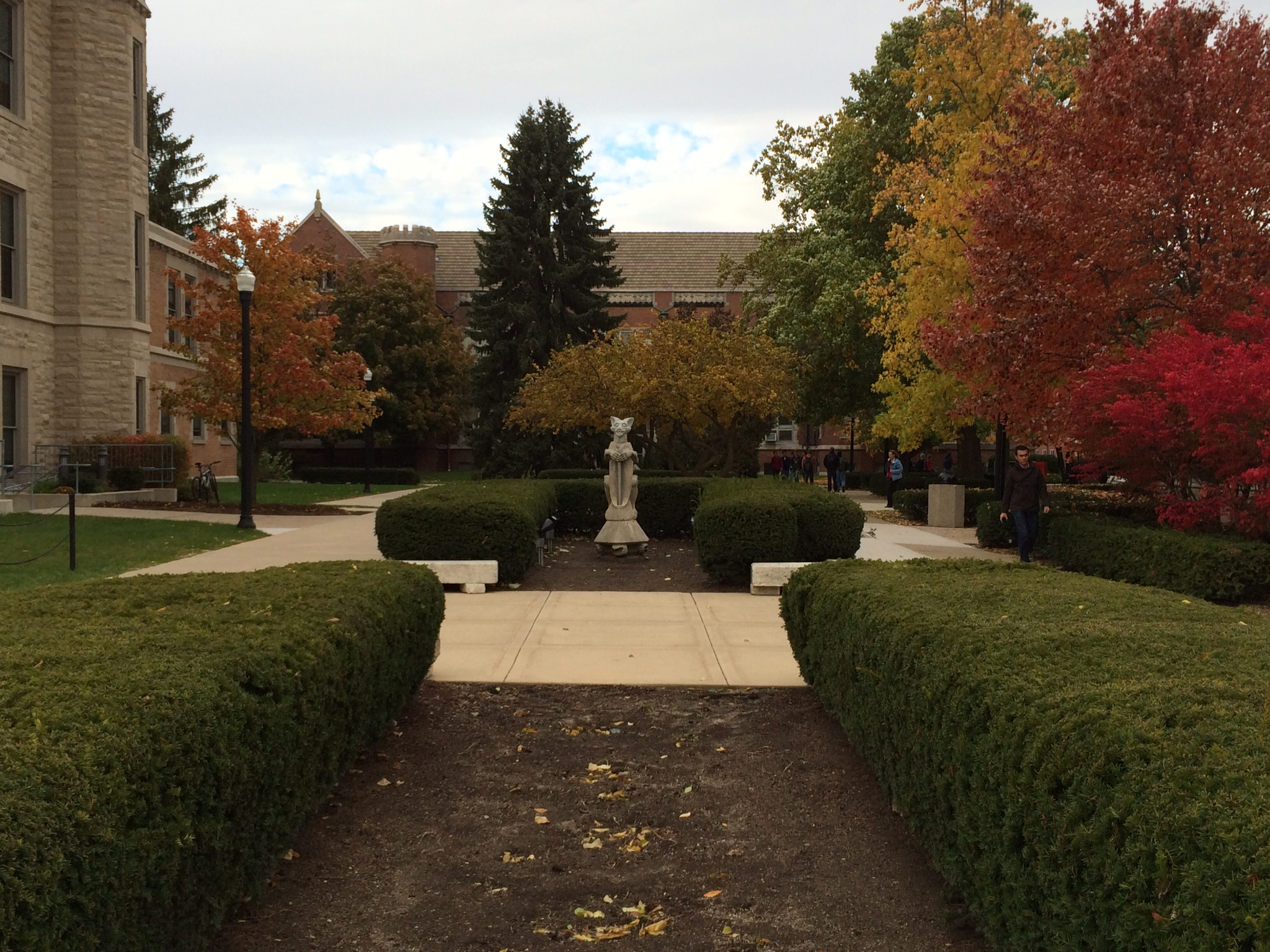
Olive Goyle sculpture near McMurry Hall

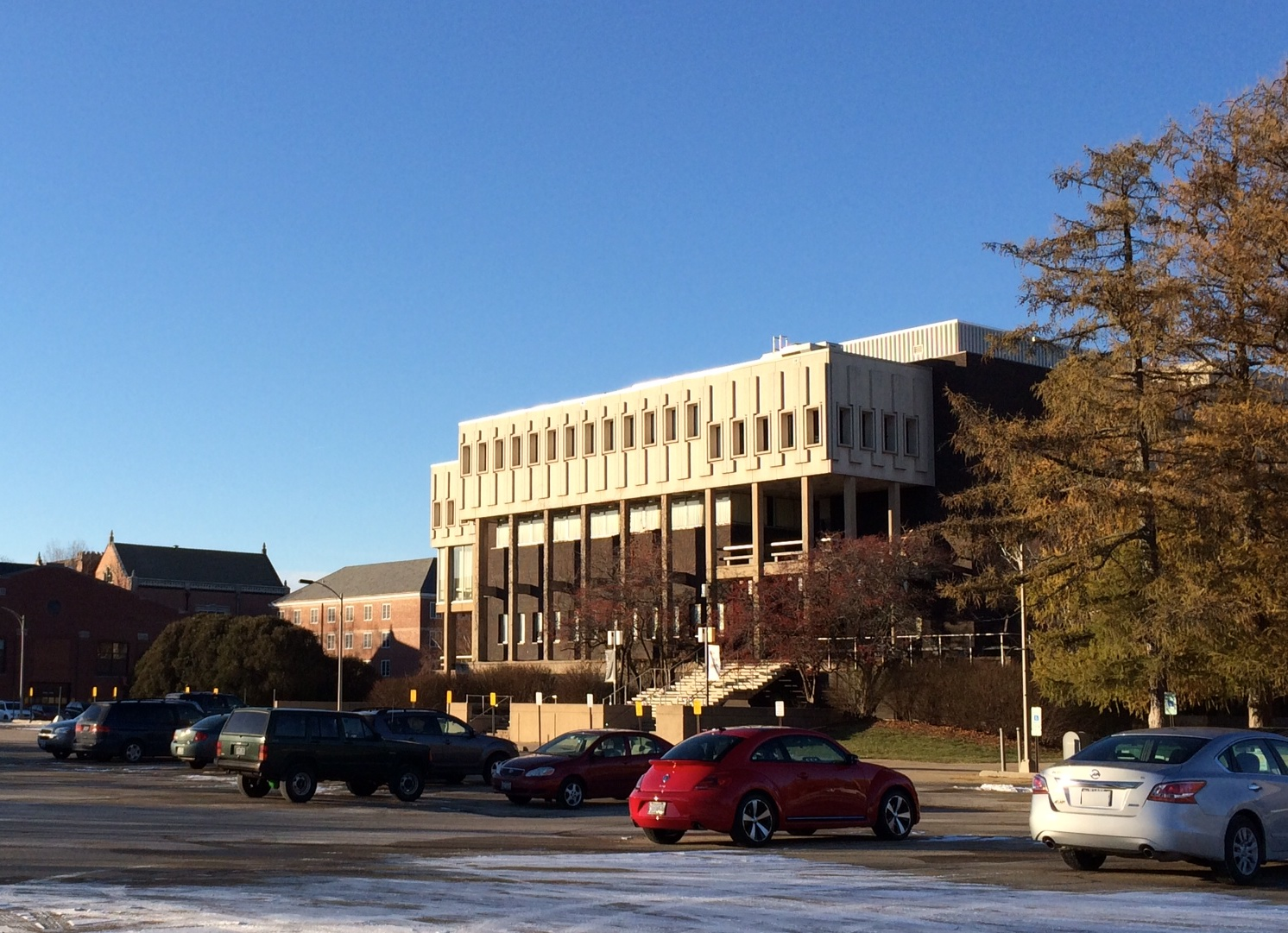
Jack Arends Hall, NIU College of Visual and Performing Arts

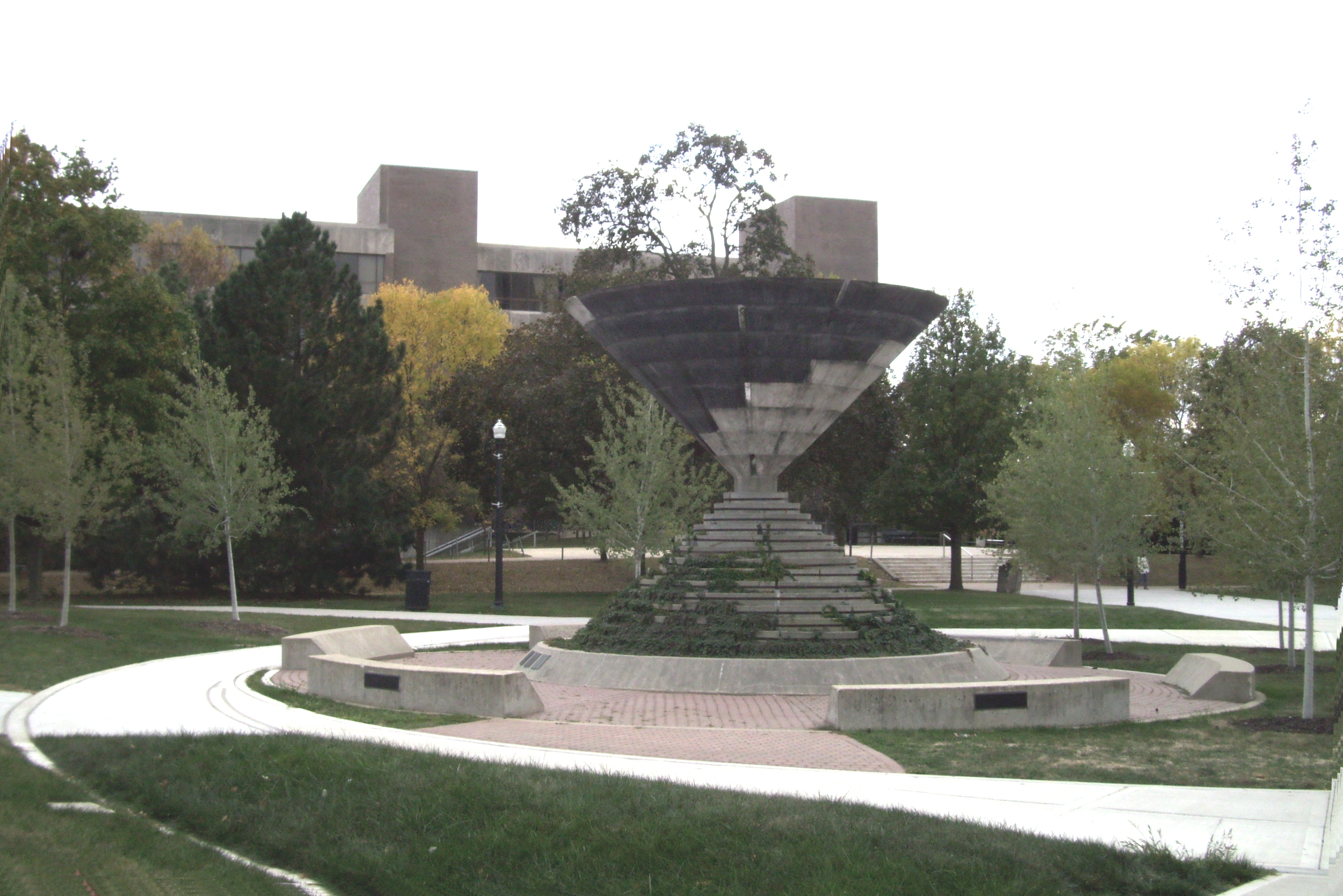
The Balance of Equality. Overlooking the sculpture is the Founders Memorial Library.

Students, faculty and guest artists in NIU's College of Visual and Performing Arts host more than 200 art exhibitions, music concerts and theatrical and dance productions throughout each year. Ticketed events are free of charge to all NIU students.

The NIU Art Museum is located on the main floor of Altgeld Hall and features a number of exhibitions every year including visiting exhibitions, exhibitions from the art museum's collection and from faculty of the NIU School of Art and Design. Jack Arends Hall, the home of the visual arts at NIU features three gallery spaces, the main Jack Olson Gallery, the Annette and Jerry Johns Student Art Gallery and the Backspace Gallery.

NIU's Pick Museum is located in Cole Hall and features works from the university's anthropology collection with a focus on North American native collections and cultural artifacts from throughout Southeast Asia. NIU is home to a large collection of Burmese art, maintained by the university's Center for Burma Studies.

There is a School of Art and Design, a School of Music, and a School of Theatre and Dance.

Theatre performances are held in the newly renovated Stevens Building which features four theatre spaces, O'Connell Theatre, a 440-foot proscenium theatre, the 220 seat Sally Stevens Players Theatre, a flexible "Black Box" Theatre that can be configured in many different seating and stage arrangements and the 150 seat Corner Theatre.

The Department of Communication sponsors the annual Reality Bytes Film Festival, created in 2002 by media studies professor Laura Vazquez to give NIU students the ability to competitively screen their work. The 2011 festival received more than 40 entries from across the country and as far away as Cuba, South Africa and Australia.

== Athletics ==
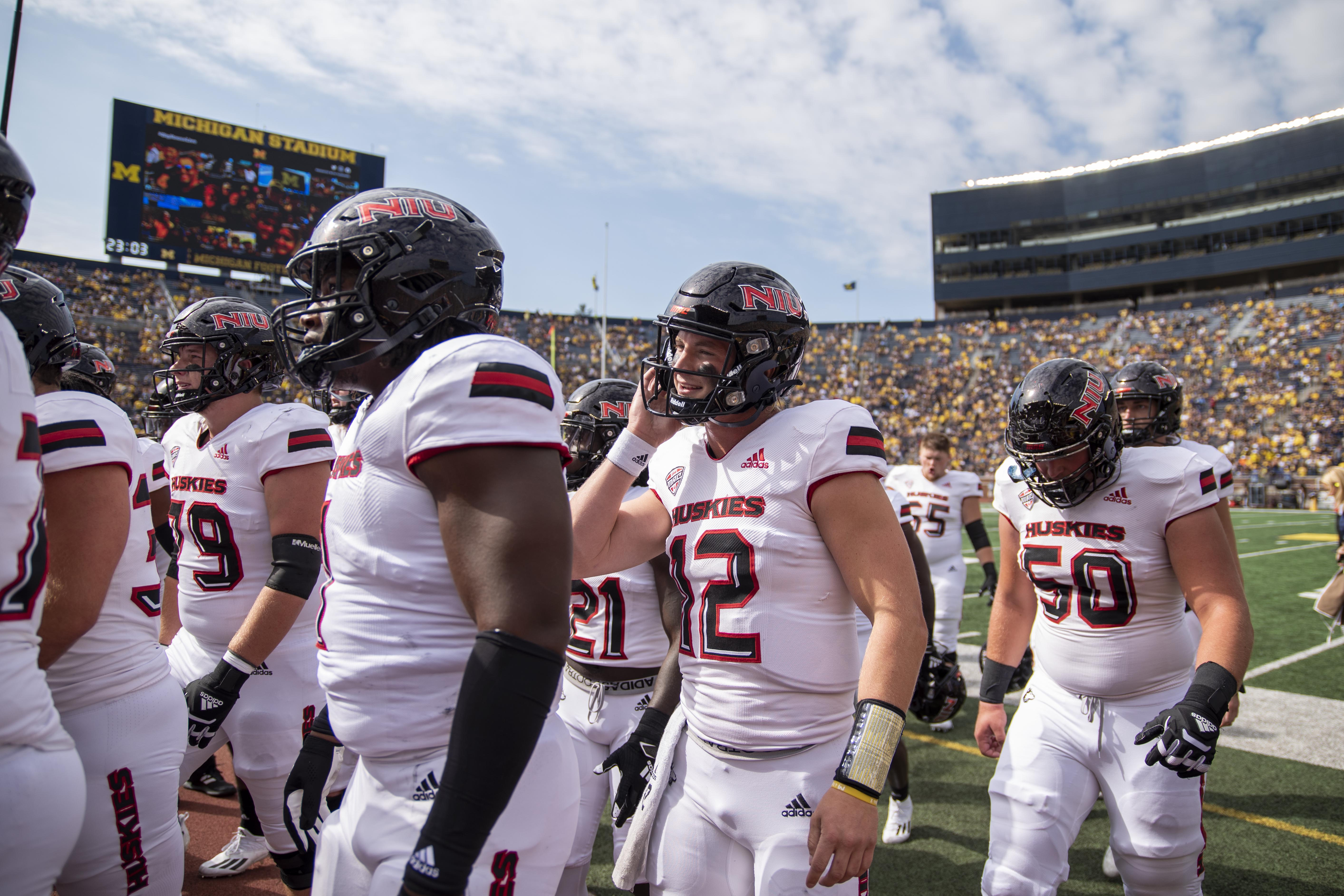
Northern Illinois Huskies football players

The Northern Illinois Huskies are a member of the NCAA Division I Football Bowl Subdivision and the Mountain West Conference for football and Horizon League for Olympic sports. The athletic program is made up of seven men's sports and 10 women's sports. NIU was a member of the Illinois Intercollegiate Athletic Conference from 1920 to 1967. The NIU Huskies are represented by two mascots: Victor E. Huskie, a person wearing a Siberian Husky costume, and Mission, a live Siberian Husky.

== See also ==
- Northern Illinois University Press
- Northern Illinois University shooting
