= Fultonhistory.com =

Newspaper archive

Old Fulton New York Postcards
- Founded: 1999; 27 years ago in Fulton, Oswego County, New York, United States
- Headquarters: Fulton, Oswego County, New York, United States
- Owner: Tom Tryniski
- Number of employees: 1
- Website: fultonhistory.com

Fultonhistory.com (also known as Old Fulton New York Postcards) is an archival historic newspaper website of over 1,000 New York newspapers, along with collections from other states and Canada. As of February 2018, the website had almost 50 million scanned newspaper pages.

== History ==
The large amount of content on the site, at least three times as large as the National Digital Newspaper Program's Chronicling America site as of 2013, is also notable because the site is operated by one person, Tom Tryniski, of Fulton, New York. He began running the website in 1999 with a collection of old postcards of Fulton. Subsequently, he scanned the entire run of the Oswego Valley News, the primary newspaper for Oswego County, New York where Fulton is located. In 2003, Tryniski purchased a microfilm scanner to expand his scanning project. As of May 2013, he is scanning approximately 250,000 pages per month.

As of December 2013, the site averaged six million page views per month. The website has retained its URL and "Old Fulton Post Cards" name despite its much expanded scope.
