= Venth =

Venth is a surname. Notable people with the surname include:

- Carl Venth (1860–1938), German-American composer
- Lydia Kunz Venth (1858–1931), American composer
