= Walter Fried =

American violinist and conductor

Walter Julius Fried (August 18, 1877 – August 18, 1925) was an American violinist and conductor. He served as both music director and as concertmaster of the Dallas Symphony Orchestra between 1911 and 1925 and was also one of Dallas's leading violin teachers during that period.

== Early life and musical education ==
Fried was born in San Francisco, California, then moved with his family to Milwaukee, Wisconsin, where he commenced violin studies. In 1907, Fried, having already served as head of the violin department of the Milwaukee College of Music for six years, traveled to Moscow for a year of study with Mikhail Press.

== Career ==
In 1908, Fried came to Dallas, Texas, where he established a violin-teaching studio. In 1910, he organized a semiprofessional orchestra, the Beethoven Symphony Orchestra, which performed several concerts in Dallas and nearby areas in 1911. During 1911, he renamed the orchestra the Dallas Symphony Orchestra, reviving the name used previously only by a semiprofessional ensemble conducted by Hans Kreissig that existed between 1900 and 1901. As the new DSO's ambitions increased, demanding a higher proportion of professional players, Fried collaborated with a colleague, Carl Venth, who had himself been organizing an orchestral ensemble, to merge the two organizations. The larger group retained the Dallas Symphony name, and, beginning late in 1911, Venth became the music director, with Fried serving as concertmaster. This group was active until 1914, when economic depression and World War I forced the orchestra to disband. In 1915, Fried was appointed as the head of the violin department at Southern Methodist University in Dallas, a position he would hold until his death. When the Dallas Symphony resumed operations in 1918, Fried was again music director. The orchestra played for six seasons. In 1924, Fried decreed a sabbatical year for the entire organization, which he felt would benefit from both artistic and administrative reorganization. Fried was preparing to resume performances with the Dallas Symphony in 1925 when he became seriously ill during a camping trip in Colorado.

Walter Fried died in Colorado Springs, Colorado, on his forty-eighth birthday.

== Personal ==
Fried was married to Gladys Wallace, who was herself a highly regarded professional violinist and teacher. Gladys Wallace Fried played violin in the Dallas Symphony, and also served as concertmaster during her husband's final six seasons as music director (1918–1924), and upon Walter's death she took over his position as professor of violin at Southern Methodist University. She was one of Dallas's most esteemed music teachers, and many of her students went on to professional careers in music.

== Sources ==
- "Dallas Symphony Orchestra Will Open Sixth Season at Auditorium Sunday Afternoon." Dallas Morning News, 23 November 1930.
- "Kreissig to Singer,—A Symphonic Resume." Dallas Morning News, 16 January 1938.
- "Walter J. Fried, Musician, Dies." Dallas Morning News, 19 August 1925.
