= 50th Annual Grammy Awards =

2008 US music awards ceremony

- Date: February 10, 2008
- Location: Crypto.com Arena, Los Angeles
- Most awards: Amy Winehouse (5)
- Most nominations: Kanye West (8)
- Website: https://www.grammy.com/awards/50th-annual-grammy-awards

Television/radio coverage
- Network: CBS

The 50th Annual Grammy Awards took place at the Staples Center in Los Angeles, on February 10, 2008. It was honoring musical achievement of 2007 in which albums were released between October 1, 2006, through September 30, 2007. The primary ceremonies were televised in the US on CBS; however, as has become the custom, most of the awards were handed out during a pre-telecast portion of the show held at the Los Angeles Convention Center and broadcast on XM Satellite Radio. Two nights prior to the show Aretha Franklin was honored as the MusiCares Person of the Year.

The year's big winner was Amy Winehouse: the 24-year-old singer had recently entered a drug rehabilitation program and did not come to Los Angeles. American officials initially refused her a work visa; they reversed the decision, but by then it was too late for her to make the trip from the UK. She became the fifth female solo artist to get five awards in one night, alongside Lauryn Hill, Norah Jones, Alicia Keys, Beyoncé and later, Alison Krauss, Adele and Billie Eilish. The nominees were announced by Taylor Hawkins and Dave Grohl of the Foo Fighters, George Lopez, Vince Gill, Herbie Hancock, Jimmy Jam, Fergie, Mike Shinoda of Linkin Park, and Akon.

The golden anniversary of the Grammys and NARAS was noted in references and performances throughout this year's ceremony. Alicia Keys was the evening's opening musician, singing and playing piano alongside archived video and audio of Frank Sinatra. Other collaborative performances linking contemporary and past musicians included Beyoncé with Tina Turner, Rihanna with The Time, classical pianist Lang Lang with jazz pianist Herbie Hancock and inaugural Grammy winner Keely Smith with Kid Rock. Special recognition of the musical contributions of The Beatles also featured. The Foo Fighters won Best Rock Album and performed their nominated song "The Pretender" in a highly collaborative performance that involved a social media selection of classical musicians (the "My Grammy Moment" YouTube contest was won by violinist Ann Marie Calhoun).

== Performances ==
Performer(s)	Song(s) Performed
Alicia Keys; Frank Sinatra	"Learnin' the Blues"
Carrie Underwood	"Before He Cheats"
The Time; Rihanna	"Jungle Love" "Umbrella" "Don't Stop the Music"
The cast of Cirque du Soleil – Love	"A Day in the Life"
The cast of Across the Universe	"Let It Be"
Kanye West; Daft Punk	"Stronger" "Hey Mama"
Fergie; John Legend	"Finally"
Beyoncé; Tina Turner	"What's Love Got to Do with It" "Better Be Good to Me" "Proud Mary"
Foo Fighters; John Paul Jones; Ann Marie Calhoun	"The Pretender"
Brad Paisley	"Ticks"
Aretha Franklin; BeBe Winans; The Madison Bumblebees; The Clark Sisters; Trin-i-tee 5:7; Israel and New Breed	"Never Gonna Break My Faith" "You Brought the Sunshine" "With Long Life" "Old Landmark"
Feist	"1234"
Keely Smith; Dave Koz; Kid Rock	"That Old Black Magic"
Alicia Keys; John Mayer	"No One
Lang Lang; Herbie Hancock	"Rhapsody in Blue"
Amy Winehouse	"You Know I'm No Good" "Rehab" (via satellite from Riverside Studios in London, England)
Eldar	"Jazz Piano Composition"
Andrea Bocelli; Josh Groban	Tribute to Luciano Pavarotti "The Prayer"
Little Richard; Jerry Lee Lewis; John Fogerty	"Comin' Down The Road" "Great Balls of Fire" "Good Golly, Miss Molly"
will.i.am	"Grammy Awards 50th Anniversary Freestyle Rap"

== Presenters ==
The following is a list of presenters:

- Prince - presented Best Female R&B Vocal Performance.
- Tom Hanks - paid tribute to The Band as a Lifetime Achievement Award recipient and introduced Cirque du Soleil and Julie Taymor
- Cyndi Lauper and Miley Cyrus - presented Best New Artist.
- Jason Bateman - Introduces a contest winner to perform with the Foo Fighters in the My Grammy contest.
- John Legend and Fergie - Presents the award for Best Soundtrack.
- Cher - Introduces a performance by Beyoncé.
- Nelly Furtado, Andy Williams, and Roselyn Sanchez - Pay tribute to Burt Bacharach as the Lifetime Achievement recipient and present the award for Song of the Year.
- George Lopez - Introduces a performance by Brad Paisley.
- Chris Brown, Akon, and Solange Knowles - Introduce the award for Best Rap Album.
- Ludacris - Pays tribute to Cab Calloway as Lifetime Achievement Recipient and introduces a gospel performance by Aretha Franklin, Bebe Winans, Madison Bumblebees, The Clark Sisters, Trin-i-Tee 5:7, and Israel & New Breed.
- Carole King and Dierks Bentley - Pay tribute to Earl Scruggs as a Lifetime Achievement recipient and introduces a performance by Feist.
- Keely Smith and Kid Rock - Presents the award for Best Rock Album.
- Stevie Wonder - Pays tribute to Berry Gordy and introduces a performance by Alicia Keys.
- Ringo Starr and Dave Stewart (Eurythmics) - Presents the award for Best Country Album.
- Joe Mantegna - Pays tribute to Itzhak Perlman and Max Roach as Lifetime Achievement recipients and introduces a performance by Herbie Hancock and Lang Lang.
- Taylor Swift and Juanes - Presents the award for Best Rap/Sung Collaboration.
- Cuba Gooding Jr. - Introduces a performance by Amy Winehouse.
- Natalie Cole and Tony Bennett - Pays tribute to Doris Day and presents the award for Record of the Year.
- Neil Portnow - Makes his annual speech and pays tribute to the 2008 WGA strike and Oscar Peterson, introduces a performance by Eldar, and presents the In Memoriam segment.
- Andrea Boccelli and Josh Groban - Pays tribute to Luciano Pavarotti.
- Usher & Quincy Jones - Album of the Year
- Bonnie Raitt - Introduces a performance by Little Richard, Jerry Lee Lewis, and John Fogerty.

== Winners and nominees ==
Bold type indicates the winner out of the list of nominees.

Multiple nominees and wins (wins/nominations)

- Amy Winehouse (5/6)
- Kanye West (4/8)
- Foo Fighters (2/5)
- Justin Timberlake (2/3)
- Herbie Hancock (2/3)
- Rihanna (1/6)

=== General ===
Record of the Year

- "**Rehab" – Amy Winehouse**
  - **Mark Ronson, producer; Tom Elmhirst, Mark Ronson, Dom Morley, Vaughan Merrick & Gabriel Roth, engineers/mixers**
- "Irreplaceable" – Beyoncé
  - Beyoncé Knowles, Ne-Yo & Stargate, producers; Jim Caruana, Jason Goldstein & Geoff Rice, engineers/mixers
- "The Pretender" – Foo Fighters
  - Gil Norton, producer; Adrian Bushby & Rich Costey, engineers/mixers
- "Umbrella" – Rihanna featuring Jay-Z
  - Kuk Harrell & C. "Tricky" Stewart, producers; Kuk Harrell & Manny Marroquin, engineers/mixers
- "What Goes Around... Comes Around" – Justin Timberlake
  - Nate (Danja) Hills, Timbaland & Justin Timberlake, producers; Jimmy Douglass & Timbaland, engineers/mixers

Album of the Year

- **River: The Joni Letters – Herbie Hancock**
  - **Leonard Cohen, Norah Jones, Joni Mitchell, Corinne Bailey Rae, Luciana Souza & Tina Turner, featured artists; Herbie Hancock & Larry Klein, producers; Helik Hadar, engineer/mixer; Bernie Grundman, mastering engineer**
- Echoes, Silence, Patience & Grace – Foo Fighters
  - Gil Norton, producer; Adrian Bushby & Rich Costey, engineers/mixers; Brian Gardner, mastering engineer
- These Days – Vince Gill
  - John Anderson, Guy Clark, Rodney Crowell, Diana Krall, Amy Grant & The Del McCoury Band, featured artists; Vince Gill, John Hobbs & Justin Niebank, producers; Neal Cappellino & Justin Niebank, engineers/mixers; Adam Ayan, mastering engineer
- Graduation – Kanye West
  - Dwele, Lil Wayne, Mos Def & T-Pain, featured artists; Warryn "Baby Dubb" Campbell, Eric Hudson, Brian "Allday" Miller, Nottz, Patrick "Plain Pat" Reynolds, Gee Roberson, Toomp & Kanye West, producers; Bruce Beuchner, Andrew Dawson, Mike Dean, Anthony Kilhoffer, Greg Koller, Manny Marroquin, Nottz Raw, Tony Rey, Seiji Sekine, Paul Sheehy & D. Sloan, engineers/mixers; Vlado Meller, mastering engineer
- Back to Black – Amy Winehouse
  - Mark Ronson & Salaamremi, producers; Tom Elmhirst, Mark Ronson, Matt Paul, Dom Morley, Vaughan Merrick, Gabriel Roth, Derek Pacuk, Gary Noble & Franklin Socorro, engineers/mixers; Stuart Hawkes, mastering engineer

Song of the Year

- **"Rehab"**
  - **Amy Winehouse, songwriter (Amy Winehouse)**
- "Before He Cheats"
  - Josh Kear & Chris Tompkins, songwriters (Carrie Underwood)
- "Hey There Delilah"
  - Tom Higgenson, songwriter (Plain White T's)
- "Like a Star"
  - Corinne Bailey Rae, songwriter (Corinne Bailey Rae)
- "Umbrella"
  - Shawn Carter, Kuk Harrell, Terius "Dream" Nash, & Christopher Stewart, songwriters (Rihanna featuring Jay-Z)

Best New Artist

- **Amy Winehouse**
- Feist
- Ledisi
- Paramore
- Taylor Swift

=== Pop ===
Best Female Pop Vocal Performance

- **"Rehab" – Amy Winehouse**
- "Candyman" – Christina Aguilera
- "1234" – Feist
- "Big Girls Don't Cry" – Fergie
- "Say It Right" – Nelly Furtado

Best Male Pop Vocal Performance

- **"What Goes Around.../...Comes Around" – Justin Timberlake**
- "Everything" – Michael Bublé
- "Belief" – John Mayer
- "Dance Tonight" – Paul McCartney
- "Amazing" – Seal

Best Pop Performance by a Duo or Group with Vocals

- **"Makes Me Wonder" – Maroon 5**
- "(You Want to) Make a Memory" – Bon Jovi
- "Home" – Daughtry
- "Hey There Delilah" – Plain White T's
- "Window in the Skies" – U2

Best Pop Collaboration With Vocals

- **"Gone Gone Gone (Done Moved On)" – Robert Plant & Alison Krauss**
- "Steppin' Out" – Tony Bennett & Christina Aguilera
- "Beautiful Liar" – Beyoncé & Shakira
- "The Sweet Escape" – Gwen Stefani & Akon
- "Give It to Me" – Timbaland featuring Nelly Furtado & Justin Timberlake

Best Pop Instrumental Performance

- **"One Week Last Summer" – Joni Mitchell**
- "Off the Grid" – Beastie Boys
- "Paris Sunrise #7" – Ben Harper & The Innocent Criminals
- "Over the Rainbow" – Dave Koz
- "Simple Pleasures" – Spyro Gyra

Best Pop Instrumental Album

- **The Mix-Up** **- Beastie Boys**
- Italia – Chris Botti
- At the Movies – Dave Koz
- Good to Go-Go – Spyro Gyra
- Roundtrip – Kirk Whalum

Best Pop Vocal Album

- **Back to Black** **– Amy Winehouse**
- Lost Highway – Bon Jovi
- The Reminder – Feist
- It Won't Be Soon Before Long – Maroon 5
- Memory Almost Full – Paul McCartney

=== Dance ===
Best Dance Recording

- **"LoveStoned/I Think She Knows Interlude"** – Justin Timberlake
  - Nate (Danja) Hills, Timbaland & Justin Timberlake, producers; Jimmy Douglass & Timbaland, mixers
- "Do It Again" – The Chemical Brothers
  - Tom Rowlands & Ed Simons, producers
- "D.A.N.C.E." – Justice
  - Gaspard Auge & Xavier de Rosnay, producers; Gaspard Auge & Xavier de Rosnay, mixers
- "Love Today" – Mika
  - Jodi Marr, John Merchant, Mika & Greg Wells, producers; Greg Wells, mixer
- "Don't Stop the Music" – Rihanna
  - StarGate, producer; Phil Tan, mixer

Best Electronic/Dance Album

- **We Are the Night** – The Chemical Brothers
- † – Justice
- Sound of Silver – LCD Soundsystem
- We Are Pilots – Shiny Toy Guns
- Elements of Life – Tiësto

=== Traditional Pop ===
Best Traditional Pop Vocal Album

- **Call Me Irresponsible** – Michael Bublé
- Cool Yule – Bette Midler
- Trav'lin' Light – Queen Latifah
- Live in Concert 2006 – Barbra Streisand
- James Taylor at Christmas – James Taylor

=== Rock ===
Best Solo Rock Vocal Performance

- **"Radio Nowhere" – Bruce Springsteen**
- "Timebomb" – Beck
- "Only Mama Knows" – Paul McCartney
- "Our Country" – John Mellencamp
- "Come On" – Lucinda Williams

Best Rock Performance by a Duo or Group with Vocal

- **"Icky Thump" – The White Stripes**
- "It's Not Over" – Daughtry
- "Working Class Hero" – Green Day
- "If Everyone Cared" – Nickelback
- "Instant Karma" – U2

Best Hard Rock Performance

- **"The Pretender" – Foo Fighters**
- "Sweet Sacrifice" – Evanescence
- "I Don't Wanna Stop" – Ozzy Osbourne
- "Sick, Sick, Sick" – Queens of the Stone Age
- "The Pot" – Tool

Best Metal Performance

- **"Final Six" – Slayer**
- "Nothing Left" – As I Lay Dying
- "Never Ending Hill" – King Diamond
- "Aesthetics of Hate" – Machine Head
- "Redemption" – Shadows Fall

Best Rock Instrumental Performance

- **"Once Upon a Time in the West" – Bruce Springsteen**
- "The Ecstasy of Gold" – Metallica
- "Malignant Narcissism" – Rush
- "Always with Me, Always with You" – Joe Satriani
- "The Attitude Song" – Steve Vai

Best Rock Song

- **"Radio Nowhere"**
  - songwriter; Bruce Springsteen (Bruce Springsteen)
- "Come On"
  - songwriter; Lucinda Williams (Lucinda Williams)
- "Icky Thump"
  - songwriter; Jack White (The White Stripes)
- "It's Not Over"
  - songwriters; Chris Daughtry, Gregg Wattenberg, Mark Wilkerson & Brett Young (Daughtry)
- "The Pretender"
  - songwriters; Dave Grohl, Taylor Hawkins, Nate Mendel & Chris Shiflett (Foo Fighters)

Best Rock Album

- **Echoes, Silence, Patience & Grace** – Foo Fighters
- Daughtry – Daughtry
- Revival – John Fogerty
- Magic – Bruce Springsteen
- Sky Blue Sky – Wilco

=== Alternative ===
Best Alternative Music Album

- **Icky Thump** – The White Stripes
- Alright, Still – Lily Allen
- Neon Bible – Arcade Fire
- Volta – Björk
- Wincing the Night Away – The Shins

=== R&B ===
Best Female R&B Vocal Performance

- **"No One" – Alicia Keys**
- "Just Fine" – Mary J. Blige
- "When I See U" – Fantasia
- "If I Have My Way"– Chrisette Michele
- "Hate on Me"– Jill Scott

Best Male R&B Vocal Performance

- **"Future Baby Mama" – Prince**
- "Woman" – Raheem DeVaughn
- "B.U.D.D.Y." – Musiq Soulchild
- "Because of You" – Ne-Yo
- "Please Don't Go" – Tank

Best R&B Performance by a Duo or Group with Vocals

- **"Disrespectful" – Chaka Khan & Mary J. Blige**
- "Same Girl" – R. Kelly & Usher
- "Hate That I Love You" – Rihanna & Ne-Yo
- "Baby"– Angie Stone & Betty Wright
- "Bartender" – T-Pain & Akon

Best Traditional R&B Vocal Performance

- **"In My Songs" – Gerald Levert**
- "Walk a Mile In My Shoes" – Otis Clay
- "All Night Long" – Randy Crawford & Joe Sample
- "I Apologize" – Ann Nesby
- "I Am Your Man" – Ryan Shaw

Best Urban/Alternative Performance

- "**Daydreamin'" – Lupe Fiasco & Jill Scott**
- "Make a Baby" – Vikter Duplaix
- "That's the Way of the World" – Dwele
- "Fantasy" – Meshell Ndegeocello
- "Dream" – Alice Smith

Best R&B Song

- **"No One"**
  - songwriters; Dirty Harry, Kerry Brothers & Alicia Keys (Alicia Keys)
- "Beautiful Flower"
  - songwriters; India.Arie & Joyce Simpson (India.Arie)
- "Hate That I Love You"
  - songwriters; M.S. Eriksen, T.E. Hermansen & Shaffer Smith (Rihanna featuring Ne-Yo)
- "Teachme"
  - songwriters; Ivan Barias, Adam W. Blackstone, Randall C. Bowland, Carvin Haggins, Johnnie Smith II & Corey Latif Williams (Musiq Soulchild)
- "When I See U"
  - songwriters; Louis Biancaniello, Waynne Nugent, Erika Nuri, Kevin Risto, Janet Sewel & Sam Watters (Fantasia)

Best R&B Album

- **Funk This** – Chaka Khan
- Lost & Found – Ledisi
- Luvanmusiq – Musiq Soulchild
- The Real Thing – Jill Scott
- Sex, Love & Pain – Tank

Best Contemporary R&B Album

- **Because of You** – Ne-Yo
- Konvicted – Akon
- Just Like You – Keyshia Cole
- Fantasia – Fantasia
- East Side Story – Emily King

=== Rap ===
Best Rap Solo Performance

- **"Stronger" – Kanye West**
- "The People" – Common
- "I Get Money" – 50 Cent
- "Show Me What You Got" – Jay-Z
- "Big Things Poppin' (Do It)" – T.I.

Best Rap Performance by a Duo or Group

- **"Southside" – Common featuring Kanye West**
- "Make It Rain" – Fat Joe featuring Lil Wayne
- "Int'l Players Anthem (I Choose You)" – UGK featuring OutKast
- "Party Like A Rockstar" – Shop Boyz
- "Better Than I've Ever Been" – Kanye West, Nas & KRS-One

Best Rap/Sung Collaboration

- "**Umbrella" – Rihanna featuring Jay-Z**
- "I Wanna Love You" – Akon featuring Snoop Dogg
- "Kiss Kiss" – Chris Brown & T-Pain
- "Let It Go" – Keyshia Cole featuring Missy Elliott & Lil' Kim
- "Good Life" – Kanye West featuring T-Pain

Best Rap Song

- **"Good Life"**
  - **A. Davis, F. Najm & K. West, songwriters; (Kanye West & T-Pain)**
- "Ayo Technology"
  - Nate (Danja) Hills, Curtis Jackson, Timothy Mosley & Justin Timberlake, songwriters; (50 Cent featuring Justin Timberlake & Timbaland)
- "Big Things Poppin' (Do It)"
  - Clifford Harris & Byron Thomas, songwriters (T.I.)
- "Can't Tell Me Nothing"
  - A. Davis & Kanye West, songwriters (Kanye West)
- "Crank That (Soulja Boy)"
  - Soulja Boy Tell 'Em, songwriter (Soulja Boy Tell 'Em)

Best Rap Album

- **Graduation – Kanye West**
- Finding Forever – Common
- Kingdom Come – Jay-Z
- Hip Hop Is Dead – Nas
- T.I. vs. T.I.P. – T.I.

=== Country ===
Best Female Country Vocal Performance

- **"Before He Cheats" – Carrie Underwood**
- "Simple Love" – Alison Krauss
- "Famous in a Small Town" – Miranda Lambert
- "Nothin' Better to Do" – LeAnn Rimes
- "Heaven, Heartache, and the Power of Love" – Trisha Yearwood

Best Male Country Vocal Performance

- **"Stupid Boy" – Keith Urban**
- "Long Trip Alone" – Dierks Bentley
- "A Woman's Love" – Alan Jackson
- "If You're Reading This" – Tim McGraw
- "Give It Away" – George Strait

Best Country Performance by a Duo or Group with Vocal

- **"How Long" – Eagles**
- "Proud of the House We Built" – Brooks & Dunn
- "Moments" – Emerson Drive
- "Lucky Man" – Montgomery Gentry
- "Sweet Memories" – The Time Jumpers

Best Country Collaboration with Vocals

- **"Lost Highway" – Willie Nelson & Ray Price**
- "Days Aren't Long Enough" – Steve Earle & Allison Moorer
- "Because of You" – Reba McEntire & Kelly Clarkson
- "I Need You" – Tim McGraw & Faith Hill
- "Oh Love" – Brad Paisley & Carrie Underwood

Best Country Instrumental Performance

- **"Throttleneck" – Brad Paisley**
- "Little Monk" – Russ Barenberg
- "Mucky the Duck" – The Greencards
- "Rawhide!" – Andy Statman
- "Fidoodlin" – The Time Jumpers

Best Country Song

- **"Before He Cheats"**
  - Josh Kear & Chris Tompkins, songwriters (Carrie Underwood)
- "Give It Away"
  - Bill Anderson, Buddy Cannon & Jamey Johnson, songwriters (George Strait)
- "I Need You"
  - Tony Lane & David Lee, songwriters (Tim McGraw featuring Faith Hill)
- "If You're Reading This"
  - Tim McGraw, Brad Warren & Brett Warren, songwriters (Tim McGraw)
- "Long Trip Alone"
  - Brett Beavers, Dierks Bentley & Steve Bogard, songwriters (Dierks Bentley)

Best Country Album

- **These Days** – Vince Gill
- Long Trip Alone – Dierks Bentley
- Let It Go – Tim McGraw
- 5th Gear – Brad Paisley
- It Just Comes Natural – George Strait

Best Bluegrass Album

- **The Bluegrass Diaries** – Jim Lauderdale
- Cherryholmes II: Black and White – Cherryholmes
- Lefty's Old Guitar – J. D. Crowe and The New South
- Scenechronized – The Seldom Scene
- Double Banjo Bluegrass Spectacular – Tony Trischka

=== New Age ===
Best New Age Album

- **Crestone** – Paul Winter Consort
- Faces of the Sun – Peter Kater
- Sacred Journey of Ku–Kai, Volume 3 – Kitarō
- One Guitar – Ottmar Liebert
- Southwest – Eric Tingstad

=== Jazz ===
Best Contemporary Jazz Album

- **River: The Joni Letters** – Herbie Hancock
- Party Hats – Will Bernard
- Downright Upright – Brian Bromberg
- Re–imagination – Eldar
- He Had a Hat – Jeff Lorber

Best Jazz Vocal Album

- **Avant Gershwin** – Patti Austin
- Red Earth: A Malian Journey – Dee Dee Bridgewater
- Music Maestro Please – Freddy Cole
- Nightmoves – Kurt Elling
- On the Other Side – Tierney Sutton

Best Jazz Instrumental Solo Performance

- **"Anagram" – Michael Brecker**
- "Levees" – Terence Blanchard
- "Both Sides Now– Herbie Hancock
- "Lullaby" – Hank Jones
- "1000 Kilometers" – Paul McCandless

Best Jazz Instrumental Album, Individual or Group

- **Pilgrimage** – Michael Brecker
- Live at the Village Vanguard – The Bill Charlap Trio
- Kids: Live at Dizzy's Club Coca-Cola – Joe Lovano and Hank Jones
- Line by Line – John Patitucci
- Back East – Joshua Redman

Best Large Jazz Ensemble Album

- **A Tale of God's Will (A Requiem for Katrina)** – Terence Blanchard
- Eternal Licks & Grooves: Limited Edition – Bob Florence
- Hommage – The Bill Holman Band
- Sky Blue – Maria Schneider Orchestra
- With Love – Charles Tolliver Big Band

Best Latin Jazz Album

- **Funk Tango** – Paquito D'Rivera Quintet
- The Magician – Sammy Figueroa and his Latin Jazz Explosion
- Borrowed Time – Steve Khan
- Refugee – Hector Martignon
- Big Band Urban Folktales – Bobby Sanabria Big Band

=== Gospel ===
Best Gospel Performance

- **"Blessed & Highly Favored" – The Clark Sisters** (tie)
- "**Never Gonna Break My Faith**" – Aretha Franklin & Mary J. Blige (Featuring The Harlem Boys Choir) (tie)
- "East to West" – Casting Crowns
- "With Long Life" – Israel And New Breed Featuring T-Bone
- "He Set My Life to Music" – CeCe Winans

Best Gospel Song

- **"Blessed & Highly Favored"**
  - Karen Clark Sheard, songwriter (The Clark Sisters)
- "East to West"
  - Mark Hall & Bernie Herms, songwriters (Casting Crowns)
- "Encourage Yourself"
  - Donald Lawrence, songwriter (Donald Lawrence & The Tri–City Singers)
- "Made to Love"
  - Cary Barlowe, Toby McKeehan, Jamie Moore & Aaron Rice, songwriters (TobyMac)
- "Praise on the Inside"
  - James L. Moss, songwriter (J. Moss)

Best Rock or Rap Gospel Album

- **Before the Daylight's Shot** – Ashley Cleveland
- HIStory: Our Place In His Story – The Cross Movement
- Open Book – Da' T.R.U.T.H.
- The Reckoning – Pillar
- Comatose – Skillet

Best Pop/Contemporary Gospel Album

- **A Deeper Level** – Israel and New Breed
- The Altar and the Door – Casting Crowns
- True Beauty – Mandisa
- Stand – Michael W. Smith
- Portable Sounds – TobyMac

Best Southern/Country/Bluegrass Gospel Album

- **Salt of the Earth** – Ricky Skaggs & The Whites
- Amazing Grace – Bill & Gloria Gaither and the Homecoming Friends
- Journey of Joy – Karen Peck & New River
- Everybody's Brother – Billy Joe Shaver
- Tell Someone – Kenny & Amanda Smith Band
- I'll Fly Away: Country Hymns & Songs of Faith – Various Artists

Best Traditional Gospel Album

- **Live: One Last Time** – The Clark Sisters
- The Grand Finale': Encourage Yourself – Donald Lawrence & The Tri–City Singers
- Life Changing – Smokie Norful
- Thirsty – Marvin Sapp
- Cherch – Bebe Winans

Best Contemporary R&B Gospel Album

- **Free to Worship** – Fred Hammond
- Grateful – Coko
- V2 ...– J. Moss
- T57 – Trin-i-tee 5:7
- Alone But Not Alone – Marvin Winans

=== Latin ===
Best Latin Pop Album

- **El Tren de los Momentos** – Alejandro Sanz
- Papito – Miguel Bosé
- 12 Segundos de Oscuridad – Jorge Drexler
- Navidades – Luis Miguel
- Dicen Que El Tiempo – Jennifer Peña

Best Latin Rock or Alternative Album

- **No Hay Espacio** – Black Guayaba
- Adelantando – Jarabe De Palo
- Amantes Sunt Amentes – Panda
- Kamikaze – Los Rabanes
- Memo Rex Commander y el Corazón Atómico de la Vía Láctea – Zoé

Best Latin Urban Album

- **Residente O Visitante** – Calle 13
- E.S.L. – Akwid
- El Abayarde Contraataca – Tego Calderón
- El Cartel: The Big Boss – Daddy Yankee
- Vacaneria! – Fulanito

Best Tropical Latin Album

- **La Llave de mi Corazón** – Juan Luis Guerra
- Greetings From Havana – Cubanismo
- En Primera Plana – Issac Delgado
- Arroz con Habichuela – El Gran Combo De Puerto Rico
- United We Swing – Spanish Harlem Orchestra

Best Mexican/Mexican–American Album

- **100% Mexicano** – Pepe Aguilar
- El Indomable – Cristian Castro
- Para Siempre – Vicente Fernández
- Puro Dolor – Paquita la del Barrio
- Esta Tierra Es Tuya (This Land Is Your Land) – Sones De México Ensemble

Best Tejano Album

- **Before the Next Teardrop Falls** – Little Joe & La Familia
- Ram Herrera and the Outlaw Band 2007 – Ram Herrera and the Outlaw Band
- Corazon de Oro – David Marez
- 35th Anniversary – Ruben Ramos
- Vagar Libremente – Sunny Sauceda

Best Banda Album

- **Te Va a Gustar** – El Chapo
- Los Mejores Corridos – El Potro De Sinaloa
- Lobo Domesticado – Valentin Elizalde
- Conquistando Corazones – K-PAZ De La Sierra
- Entre Copas y Botellas – Lupillo Rivera

=== Blues ===
Best Traditional Blues Album

- **Last of the Great Mississippi Delta Bluesmen: Live In Dallas** – Henry James Townsend, Joe Willie "Pinetop" Perkins, Robert Lockwood Jr. & David Honeyboy Edwards
- Pinetop Perkins on the 88's: Live in Chicago – Pinetop Perkins
- Live...and in Concert from San Francisco – Otis Rush
- 10 Days Out: Blues from the Backroads – Kenny Wayne Shepherd featuring Various Artists
- Old School – Koko Taylor

Best Contemporary Blues Album

- **The Road to Escondido** – J. J. Cale & Eric Clapton
- Into the Blues – Joan Armatrading
- Is It News – Doyle Bramhall
- Truth – Robben Ford
- The Scene of the Crime – Bettye LaVette

=== Folk ===
Best Traditional Folk Album

- **Dirt Farmer** – Levon Helm
- Try Me One More Time – David Bromberg
- Let Us Now Praise Sleepy John – Peter Case
- Banjo Talkin – Cathy Fink
- Charlie Louvin – Charlie Louvin

Best Contemporary Folk Album

- **Washington Square Serenade** – Steve Earle
- The Calling – Mary Chapin Carpenter
- My Name Is Buddy – Ry Cooder
- Children Running Through – Patty Griffin
- Orphans: Brawlers, Bawlers & Bastards – Tom Waits

Best Native American Music Album

- **Totemic Flute Chants** – Johnny Whitehorse
- Oklahoma Style – Walter Ahhaitty & Friends
- Watch This Dancer! – Black Lodge
- The Ballad of Old Times – Davis Mitchell
- Reconnections – R. Carlos Nakai, Cliff Sarde, William Eaton & Randy Wood

Best Hawaiian Music Album

- **Treasures of Hawaiian Slack Key Guitar** – Various Artists
- Ka Hikina O Ka Hau (The Coming of the Snow) – Keola Beamer
- Hawaiiana – Tia Carrere
- He'eia – Cyril Pahinui
- Hawaiian Blossom – Raiatea Helm

Best Zydeco Or Cajun Music Album

- **Live! Worldwide** – Terrance Simien and the Zydeco Experience
- Le Cowboy Creole – Geno Delafose & French Rockin' Boogie
- King Cake – Lisa Haley
- Live: Á La Blue Moon – Lost Bayou Ramblers
- Blues De Musicien – Pine Leaf Boys
- Racines – Racines
- The La Louisianne Sessions – Roddie Romero and the Hub City All–Stars

=== Reggae ===
Best Reggae Album

- **Mind Control** – Stephen Marley
- The Burning Spear Experience – Burning Spear
- The End of an American Dream – Lee "Scratch" Perry
- Anniversary – Sly & Robbie and the Taxi Gang
- Light Your Light – Toots & The Maytals

=== World Music ===
Best Traditional World Music Album

- **African Spirit** – Soweto Gospel Choir
- When the Soul Is Settled: Music of Iraq – Rahim Al Haj With Souhail Kaspa
- From Mali to America – Cheick Hamala Diabat & Bob Carlin
- Live at Couleur Café – Konono Nº1
- Singing for Life: Songs of Hope, Healing, and HIV/AIDS in Uganda – Various Artists

Best Contemporary World Music Album

- **Djin Djin** – Angelique Kidjo
- CéU – Céu
- Gil Luminoso – Gilberto Gil
- Momento – Bebel Gilberto
- An Ancient Muse – Loreena McKennitt

Best Polka Album

- **Come Share the Wine** – Jimmy Sturr & His Orchestra
- Polka's Revenge – Brave Combo
- Bulletproof Polkas – John Gora & Gorale
- Polka Freak Out – Bubba Hernandez & Alex Meixner
- Dueling Polkas – Walter Ostanek and His Band & Brian Sklar and the Western Senators

=== Children's ===
Best Children's Music Album

- **A Green and Red Christmas** – The Muppets
- Chickens – Buck Howdy with BB
- Experience...101 – Sweet Honey in the Rock
- I Wanna Play – Bill Harley
- My Green Kite – Peter Himmelman
- The Velveteen Rabbit: Love Can Make You Real – Various Artists

Best Children's Spoken Word Album

- **Harry Potter and the Deathly Hallows** – Jim Dale
- Making the Heart Whole Again: Stories for a Wounded World – Milbre Burch
- The One and Only Shrek – Meryl Streep & Stanley Tucci
- Who's Got Game? The Ant or the Grasshopper? The Lion or the Mouse? Poppy or the Snake? – Toni Morrison
- Wickety Whack: Brer Rabbit Is Back – Diane Ferlatte

=== Spoken Word ===
Best Spoken Word Album

- **The Audacity of Hope : Thoughts on Reclaiming the American Dream** – Barack Obama
- Celebrations – Maya Angelou
- Giving: How Each of Us Can Change the World – Bill Clinton
- Sunday Mornings in Plains: Bringing Peace to a Changing World – Jimmy Carter
- Things I Overheard While Talking to Myself – Alan Alda

=== Comedy ===
Best Comedy Album

- **The Distant Future** – Flight of the Conchords
- America's Mexican – George Lopez
- Dirty Girl – Lisa Lampanelli
- I Still Have a Pony – Steven Wright
- Songs Pointed & Pointless – Harry Shearer

=== Musical Show ===
Best Musical Show Album

- **Spring Awakening**
  - Duncan Sheik, producer; Duncan Sheik, composer; Steven Sater, lyricist (Original Broadway Cast with Jonathan Groff, Lea Michele & Others)
- A Chorus Line
  - David Caddick, producer (Marvin Hamlisch, composer; Edward Kleban, lyricist) (2006 New Cast Recording with Various Artists)
- Company
  - Tommy Krasker, producer (Stephen Sondheim, composer/lyricist) (2006 Cast Recording with Raúl Esparza & Others)
- Grey Gardens
  - Steven Epstein, producer (Scott Frankel, composer; Michael Korie, lyricist) (Original Broadway Cast with Christine Ebersole, Mary Louise Wilson & Others)
- West Side Story
  - Nick Patrick, producer (Leonard Bernstein, composer; Stephen Sondheim, lyricist) (Vittorio Grigolo, Hayley Westenra, Connie Fisher & Others)

=== Film, Television and Other Visual Media ===
Best Compilation Soundtrack Album

- **Love** – George Martin & Giles Martin (The Beatles)
- Across The Universe – Various Artists
- Dreamgirls – Various Artists
- Hairspray – Various Artists
- Once – Glen Hansard & Markéta Irglová

Best Score Soundtrack Album

- **Ratatouille** – Michael Giacchino
- Babel – Gustavo Santaolalla
- Blood Diamond – James Newton Howard
- The Departed – Howard Shore
- Happy Feet – John Powell
- Pan's Labyrinth – Javier Navarrete

Best Song Written for a Motion Picture, Television or Other Visual Media

- "**Love You I Do**" (from Dreamgirls)
  - Siedah Garrett & Henry Krieger, songwriters (Jennifer Hudson)
- "Falling Slowly" (from Once)
  - Glen Hansard & Marketa Irglova, songwriters (Glen Hansard & Markéta Irglová)
- "Guaranteed" (from Into the Wild)
  - Eddie Vedder, songwriter (Eddie Vedder)
- "Song of the Heart" (From Happy Feet)
  - Prince Rogers Nelson, songwriter (Prince)
- "You Know My Name" (from Casino Royale)
  - David Arnold & Chris Cornell, songwriters (Chris Cornell)

=== Composing/Arranging ===
Best Instrumental Composition

- **"Cerulean Skies"**
  - Maria Schneider, composer (Maria Schneider Orchestra)
- "Ash Wednesday"
  - Harry Connick Jr., composer (Harry Connick Jr.)
- "Deep Six"
  - Mark Walker, composer (Oregon)
- "I Knew Her"
  - Philip Glass, composer (Philip Glass)
- "Spectacle"
  - Béla Fleck, composer (Chick Corea & Béla Fleck)

Best Instrumental Arrangement

- **"In a Silent Way"**
  - Vince Mendoza, arranger (Joe Zawinul)
- "Ash Wednesday"
  - Harry Connick Jr., arranger (Harry Connick Jr.)
- "Besame Mucho"
  - Steve Wiest, arranger (Maynard Ferguson)
- "Black Is the Color of My True Love's Hair"
  - Frank Macchia, arranger (Frank Macchia & The Prague Orchestra)
- "Yo Tannenbaum (From Bah, Humduck! A Looney Tunes Christmas)"
  - Gordon Goodwin, arranger (Gordon Goodwin's Big Phat Band)

Best Instrumental Arrangement Accompanying Vocalist(s)

- **"I'm Gonna Live Till I Die"**
  - John Clayton, arranger (Queen Latifah)
- "Cry Me a River"
  - Jorge Calandrelli, arranger (Ella Fitzgerald & Jorge Calandrelli)
- "In the Wee Small Hours of the Morning"
  - Jay Ashby, Darmon Meader & Kim Nazarian, arrangers (New York Voices)
- "Overture/Gershwin Medley"
  - Michael Abene, arranger (Patti Austin)
- "Smile"
  - Pete McGuinness, arranger (The Pete McGuinness Jazz Orchestra)

=== Package ===
Best Recording Package

- **Cassadaga**
  - Zack Nipper, art director (Bright Eyes)
- The Dio Years
  - Masaki Koike, art director (Black Sabbath)
- Friend & Foe
  - Craig Thompson, art director (Menomena)
- Secrets Keep You Sick
  - Don Clark, art director (The Fold)
- White Horse
  - Qing-Yang Xiao, art director (GTS)

Best Boxed/Special Limited Edition

- **What It Is!: Funky Soul and Rare Grooves (1967–1977)**
  - Masaki Koike, art director (Various Artists)
- The Black Parade
  - Special Edition- Matt Taylor, Ellen Wakayama & Gerard Way, art directors (My Chemical Romance)
- A Fever You Can't Sweat Out
  - Limited Edition Collectible Deluxe Box- Alex Kirzhner, art director (Panic! At The Disco)
- Icky Thump
  - Limited Edition USB Flash Drive- Stan Chow, art director (The White Stripes)
- Venus Doom
  - Matt Taylor & Ville Valo, art directors (HIM)

=== Album Notes ===
Best Album Notes

- **John Work III: Recording Black Culture**
  - Bruce Nemerov (Various Artists)
- Actionable Offenses: Indecent Phonograph Recordings from the 1890s
  - Patrick Feaster and David Giovannoni (Various Artists)
- Classic Chu Berry Columbia and Victor Sessions
  - Loren Schoenberg (Leon "Chu" Berry)
- Off the Record: The Complete 1923 Jazz Band Recordings
  - David Sager ("King" Oliver's Creole Jazz Band)
- Ricky Jay Plays Poker
  - Ricky Jay (Various Artists)

=== Historical ===
Best Historical Album

- **The Live Wire: Woody Guthrie in Performance 1949**
  - Nora Guthrie & Jorge Arévalo Mateus, compilation producers; Jamie Howarth, Steve Rosenthal, Warren Russell-Smith & Dr. Kevin Short, mastering engineers (Woody Guthrie)
- Actionable Offenses: Indecent Phonograph Recordings from the 1890s
  - David Giovannoni, Meagan Hennessey & Richard Martin, compilation producers; Richard Martin, mastering engineer (Various Artists)
- Forever Changing: The Golden Age of Elektra Records 1963-1973 (Deluxe Edition)
  - Stuart Batsford, Mick Houghton & Phil Smee, compilation producers; Dan Hersch & Bill Inglot, mastering engineers (Various Artists)
- Love Is the Song We Sing: San Francisco Nuggets 1965-1970
  - Alec Palao, compilation producer; Dan Hersch, Bill Inglot & Dave Schultz, mastering engineers (Various Artists)
- People Take Warning! Murder Ballads & Disaster Songs 1913-1938
  - Christopher King & Henry "Hank" Sapoznik, compilation producers; Christopher King & Robert Vosgien, mastering engineers (Various Artists)

=== Production, Non Classical ===
Best Engineered Album, Non Classical

- **Beauty & Crime**
  - Tchad Blake, Cameron Craig, Emery Dobyns & Jimmy Hogarth, engineers (Suzanne Vega)
- Destination Moon
  - Dave O'Donnell & Elliot Scheiner, engineers (Deborah Cox)
- Don't Mess With the Dragon
  - Robert Carranza, Serban Ghenea, John Hanes & KC Porter, engineers (Ozomatli)
- Floratone
  - Tucker Martine, engineer (Floratone)
- II
  - Jason Lehning, engineer (Viktor Krauss)

Producer of the Year, Non Classical

- **Mark Ronson**
  - "Back to Black" (Amy Winehouse) (T)
  - "Littlest Things" (Lily Allen) (T)
  - "Rehab" (Amy Winehouse) (T)
  - Version (Mark Ronson) (A)
  - "You Know I'm No Good" (Amy Winehouse) (T)
- Howard Benson
  - Daughtry (Daughtry) (A)
  - Devils & Angels (Mêlée) (A)
  - Direction (The Starting Line) (A)
  - Five Score and Seven Years Ago (Relient K) (A)
  - Stay Inside (Sound the Alarm) (A)
- Joe Chiccarelli
  - Mercy (Burden Brothers) (A)
  - The Narcotic Story (Oxbow) (A)
  - Nightmoves (Kurt Elling) (A)
  - Wincing the Night Away (The Shins) (A)
- Mike Elizondo
  - It Won't Be Soon Before Long (Maroon 5) (A)
  - Under the Blacklight (Rilo Kiley) (A)
- Timbaland
  - Come Around (M.I.A. featuring Timbaland) (T)
  - "Give It to Me" (Timbaland featuring Nelly Furtado & Justin Timberlake) (T)
  - Make Me Better (Fabolous featuring Ne-Yo) (S)
  - Timbaland Presents: Shock Value (Timbaland) (A)
  - "The Way I Are (Timbaland featuring Keri Hilson & D.O.E.) (S)

Best Remixed Recording

- **"Bring the Noise" (Benny Benassi Pump-Kin Remix)**
  - Benny Benassi, remixer (Public Enemy)
- "Angelicus" (Andy Moor Full Length Mix)
  - Andy Moor, remixer (Delerium featuring Isabel Bayrakdarian)
- "Like a Child" (Carl Craig Remix)
  - Carl Craig, remixer (Junior Boys)
- "Proper Education" (Club Mix - Radio Edit)
  - Eric Prydz, remixer (Eric Prydz vs. Pink Floyd)
- "Sorry" (Dirty South Mix)
  - Dirty South, remixer (Kaskade)

=== Production, Surround Sound ===
Best Surround Sound Album

- **Love**
  - Paul Hicks, surround mix engineer; Tim Young, surround mastering engineer; George Martin & Giles Martin, surround producers (The Beatles)
- At War With the Mystics 5.1
  - The Flaming Lips & Dave Fridmann, surround mix engineers; The Flaming Lips & Dave Fridmann, surround mastering engineers; The Flaming Lips & Dave Fridmann, surround producers (The Flaming Lips)
- Fear of a Blank Planet
  - Steven Wilson, surround mix engineer; Darcy Proper, surround mastering engineer; Porcupine Tree, surround producers (Porcupine Tree)
- Grechaninov: Passion Week
  - John Newton, surround mix engineer; Jonathan Cooper, surround mastering engineer; Blanton Alspaugh, surround producer (Charles Bruffy, Kansas City Chorale & Phoenix Bach Choir)
- Vaughan Williams: Symphony No. 5; Fantasia on a Theme by Thomas Tallis; Serenade to Music
  - Michael Bishop, surround mix engineer; Michael Bishop, surround mastering engineer; Elaine Martone, surround producer (Robert Spano & Atlanta Symphony Orchestra & Chamber Chorus)

=== Production, Classical ===
Best Engineered Album, Classical

- Garden of Dreams
  - Keith O. Johnson, engineer (Jerry Junkin & Dallas Wind Symphony)
- **Grechaninov: Passion Week**
  - John Newton, engineer (Charles Bruffy, Phoenix Bach Choir & Kansas City Chorale)
- Nielsen: Clarinet & Flute Concertos
  - Arne Akselberg & Tobias Lehmann, engineers (Sabine Meyer, Emmanuel Pahud & Simon Rattle)
- Spirit of the Season
  - Bruce Leek, Fred Vogler & Trent Walker, engineers (Craig Jessop, Mack Wilberg & Mormon Tabernacle Choir)
- Strauss: Don Juan, Death and Transfiguration
  - Lawrence Rock, engineer (Lorin Maazel & New York Philharmonic)

Producer of the Year, Classical

- Blanton Alspaugh
  - Eternal Rest: Mäntyjärvi, Ticheli, Martin, Clausen (Charles Bruffy, Phoenix Bach Choir & Kansas City Chorale)
  - Grechaninov: Passion Week (Charles Bruffy, Phoenix Bach Choir & Kansas City Chorale)
  - The Harrington String Quartet: Daniel McCarthy (The Harrington String Quartet)
  - Hartke: The Greater Good (Stewart Robertson & Glimmerglass Opera Orchestra)
  - Rider On The Plains: Cello Concertos By Virgil Thomson And Charles Fussell (Emmanuel Feldman)
- John Fraser
  - Chopin: Piano Sonata No. 2, Scherzos (Simon Trpceski)
  - Great Handel (Ian Bostridge)
  - Kate Royal (Kate Royal)
  - Krommer/Spohr: Clarinet Concertos (Julian Bliss, Sabine Meyer & Kenneth Sillito)
  - Schubert: Piano Sonata D958, Lieder, Fragments (Leif Ove Andsnes & Ian Bostridge)
- Marina A. Ledin
  - Balakirev And Russian Folksong (Joseph Banowetz)
  - Louisiana - A Pianist's Journey (Kenneth Boulton)
  - Piano Impromptus (Jungran Kim Khwarg)
  - 20th Century Piano Sonatas (Allison Brewster Franzetti)
- **Judith Sherman**
  - American Virtuosa: Tribute To Maud Powell (Rachel Barton Pine & Matthew Hagle)
  - From Barrelhouse To Broadway: The Musical Odyssey Of Joe Jordan (Rick Benjamin & The Paragon Ragtime Orchestra)
  - Górecki: String Quartet No. 3 '...Songs Are Sung' (Kronos Quartet)
  - Strange Imaginary Animals (Eighth Blackbird)
  - Tchaikovsky: Three String Quartets, Souvenir De Florence (Ying Quartet)
- Robina G. Young
  - As Steals The Morn...Handel Arias & Scenes For Tenor (Mark Padmore, Andrew Manze & The English Concert)
  - Bach, CPE: Symphonies 1–4, Cello Concerto (Andrew Manze & The English Concert)
  - Brahms: Variations (Olga Kern)
  - Music For Compline (Stile Antico)
  - Stockhausen: Stimmung (Paul Hillier & Theatre Of Voices)

=== Classical ===
Best Classical Album

- Cherubini: Missa Solemnis in E
  - Riccardo Muti, conductor; Wilhelm Meister, producer (Ildar Abdrazakov, Herbert Lippert, Marianna Pizzolato & Ruth Ziesak; Symphonieorchester Des Bayerischen Rundfunks)
- Grechaninov: Passion Week
  - Charles Bruffy, conductor; Blanton Alspaugh, producer (Kansas City Chorale & Phoenix Bach Choir)
- Homage: The Age of the Diva
  - Renée Fleming; David Frost, producer (Valery Gergiev; Orchestra Of The Mariinsky Theatre)
- Lorraine Hunt Lieberson Sings Peter Lieberson: Neruda Songs
  - Lorraine Hunt Lieberson; Dirk Sobotka, producer (James Levine; Boston Symphony Orchestra)
- **Tower: Made In America**
  - Leonard Slatkin, conductor; Tim Handley, producer (Nashville Symphony)

Best Orchestra Performance

- "Beethoven: Symphony No. 9"
  - Osmo Vänskä, conductor (Minnesota Orchestra)
- "Shostakovich: The Golden Age"
  - José Serebrier, conductor (Royal Scottish National Orchestra)
- "Stravinsky: Le Sacre Du Printemps"
  - Esa–Pekka Salonen, conductor (Los Angeles Philharmonic)
- **"Tower: Made in America"**
  - Leonard Slatkin, conductor (Nashville Symphony)
- "Vaughan Williams: Symphony No. 5, Fantasia on a Theme of Thomas Tallis, Serenade to Music"
  - Robert Spano, conductor (Atlanta Symphony Orchestra)

Best Opera Recording

- "Albéniz: Pepita Jiménez"
  - José De Eusebio, conductor; Enrique Baquerizo, Carlos Chausson, Plácido Domingo, Jane Henschel & Carol Vaness; Michael Haas, producer (Orquesta Y Coro De La Comunidad De Madrid)
- "Donizetti: Dom Sébastien, Roi De Portugal"
  - Mark Elder, conductor; Carmelo Corrado Caruso, Giuseppe Filianoti, Vesselina Kasarova, Simon Keenlyside & Alastair Miles; Patric Schmid, producer (The Royal Opera Chorus; The Orchestra of the Royal Opera House, Covent Garden)
- **"Humperdinck: Hansel & Gretel"**
  - Sir Charles Mackerras, conductor; Rebecca Evans, Jane Henschel & Jennifer Larmore; Brian Couzens, producer (Sarah Coppen, Diana Montague & Sarah Tynan; New London Children's Choir; Philharmonia Orchestra)
- "Lully: Thésée"
  - Paul O'Dette & Stephen Stubbs, conductors; Howard Crook, Ellen Hargis, Laura Pudwell & Harry van der Kamp; Renate Wolter–Seevers, producer (Boston Early Music Festival Chorus and Orchestra)
- "Verdi: La Traviata"
  - Zubin Mehta, conductor; Piotr Beczala, Paolo Gavanelli & Anja Harteros; Andreas Caemmerer & Felix Gargerle, producers (Choir of the Bavarian State Opera; Bavarian State Orchestra)

Best Choral Performance

- **"Brahms: Ein Deutsches Requiem"**
  - Simon Rattle, conductor; Simon Halsey, chorus master (Thomas Quasthoff & Dorothea Röschmann; Rundfunkchor Berlin; Berliner Philharmoniker)
- "Cherubini: Missa Solemnis in E"
  - Riccardo Muti, conductor; Peter Dijkstra, chorus master (Ildar Abdrazakov, Herbert Lippert, Marianna Pizzolato & Ruth Ziesak; Chor des Bayerischen Rundfunks; Symphonieorchester des Bayerischen Rundfunks)
- "Grechaninov: Passion Week"
  - Charles Bruffy, conductor (Kansas City Chorale & Phoenix Bach Choir)
- "Penderecki: Symphony No. 7 'Seven Gates Of Jerusalem'"
  - Antoni Wit, conductor; Henryk Wojnarowski, chorus master (Boris Carmeli, Ewa Marciniec, Aga Mikolaj, Wieslaw Ochman, Olga Pasichnyk & Romuald Tesarowicz; Warsaw National Philharmonic Choir; Warsaw National Philharmonic Orchestra)
- "Schönberg: Gurre-Lieder
  - Michael Gielen, conductor; Howard Arman & Michael Gläser, choir directors (Melanie Diener, Ralf Lukas, Yvonne Naef, Andreas Schmidt, Gerhard Siegel & Robert Dean Smith; Chor des Bayerischen Rundfunks & MDR Rundfunkchor Leipzig; SWR Sinfonieorchester Baden-Baden und Freiburg)

Best Instrumental Soloist(s) Performance (with Orchestra)

- **"Barber/Korngold/Walton: Violin Concertos"**
  - Bramwell Tovey, conductor; James Ehnes (Vancouver Symphony Orchestra)
- "Beethoven: Piano Concertos Nos. 1 & 4"
  - Christoph Eschenbach, conductor; Lang Lang (Orchestre De Paris)
- "Nielsen: Clarinet & Flute Concertos"
  - Simon Rattle, conductor; Sabine Meyer & Emmanuel Pahud (Berliner Philharmoniker)
- "Rózsa: Violin Concerto, Op. 24"
  - Dmitry Yablonsky, conductor; Anastasia Khitruk (Russian Philharmonic Orchestra)
- "Tchaikovsky/Saint-Saëns/Ginastera"
  - Ari Rasilainen, conductor; Sol Gabetta (Münchner Rundfunkorchester)

Best Instrumental Soloist Performance (without Orchestra)

- **"Beethoven Sonatas, Vol. 3" – Garrick Ohlsson**
- "Haydn: Piano Sonatas" – Marc-André Hamelin
- "Louisiana: A Pianist's Journey" – Kenneth Boulton
- "Solo Piazzolla" – Manuel Barrueco
- "20th Century Piano Sonatas" – Allison Brewster Franzetti

Best Chamber Music Performance

- "On the Threshold of Hope" – Artists Of The Royal Conservatory Ensemble (Richard Margison, Joaquin Valdepeñas & Diane Werner)
- "Saint-Saëns/Poulenc/Devienne/Milhaud" – Oleg Maisenberg & Sabine Meyer
- **"Strange Imaginary Animals" – Eighth Blackbird**
- "Tchaikovsky: Three String Quartets, Souvenir De Florence" – Ying Quartet (James Dunham & Paul Katz)
- "30 Songs of the Russian People" – Joseph Banowetz & Alton Chung Ming Chan

Best Small Ensemble Performance

- "Bach: Brandenburg Concertos" – Swiss Baroque Soloists
- "Bridges: Eddie Daniels Plays the Music of Frank Proto" – Frank Proto, conductor; Eddie Daniels; Ensemble Sans Frontière
- "Mahler: Das Lied Von Der Erde" – Kenneth Slowik, conductor; The Smithsonian Chamber Players & Santa Fe Pro Musica
- "Music for Compline" – Stile Antico
- **"Stravinsky: Apollo, Concerto in D; Prokofiev: 20 Visions Fugitives" – Yuri Bashmet, conductor; Moscow Soloists**

Best Classical Vocal Performance

- "Gitano: Zarzuela Arias"
  - Rolando Villazón (Plácido Domingo; Orquesta De La Comunidad De Madrid)
- "Homage: The Age of the Diva"
  - Renée Fleming (Valery Gergiev; Orchestra Of The Mariinsky Theatre)
- **"Lorraine Hunt Lieberson Sings Peter Lieberson: Neruda Songs"**
  - Lorraine Hunt Lieberson (James Levine; Boston Symphony Orchestra)
- "Russian Album"
  - Anna Netrebko (Valery Gergiev; Orchestra Of The Mariinsky Theatre)
- "Sea Pictures, Op. 37"
  - Sarah Connolly (Simon Wright; Bournemouth Symphony Chorus; Bournemouth Symphony Orchestra)

Best Classical Contemporary Composition

- "Amargós: Northern Concerto"
  - Joan Albert Amargós (Lan Shui, conductor; Danish National Symphony Orchestra/DR)
- "Chesky: Concerto for Bassoon and Orchestra"
  - David Chesky (Rossen Gergov, conductor; Symphony Orchestra Of Norrlands Opera)
- "Higdon: Zaka"
  - Jennifer Higdon (Eighth Blackbird)
- "Lorraine Hunt Lieberson Sings Peter Lieberson: Neruda Songs"
  - Peter Lieberson (James Levine, conductor; Boston Symphony Orchestra)
- **"Made in America"**
  - Joan Tower (Leonard Slatkin, conductor; Nashville Symphony Orchestra)

Best Classical Crossover Album

- The Jazz Album: Watch What Happens – Thomas Quasthoff
- **A Love Supreme: The Legacy of John Coltrane – Turtle Island String Quartet**
- Spirit of the Season – Craig Jessop & Mack Wilberg, conductors (Mormon Tabernacle Choir; Orchestra At Temple Square)
- Whirled Chamber Music – Quartet San Francisco
- Wolfgang's Big Night Out – Brian Setzer (The Brian Setzer Orchestra)

=== Music video ===
Best Short Form Music Video

- "**God's Gonna Cut You Down**" – Johnny Cash
  - Tony Kaye, video director; Rachel Curl, video producer
- "1234" – Feist
  - Patrick Daughters, video director; Geoff McLean, video producer
- "Gone Daddy Gone" – Gnarls Barkley
  - Chris Milk, video director; Barbara Benson, video producer
- "D.A.N.C.E." – Justice
  - Jonas & François and So-Me, video directors and producers
- "Typical" – Mutemath
  - Israel Anthem, video director; Brandon Arolfo, video producer

Best Long Form Music Video

- **The Confessions Tour** – Madonna
  - Jonas Akerlund, video director; Sara Martin and David May, video producers
- Live and Loud at the Fillmore – Dierks Bentley
  - Russell Thomas, video director; James Whetherly, video producer
- Trapped in the Closet: Chapters 13-22 – R. Kelly
  - R. Kelly, Jim Swaffield and Victor Mignatti, video directors; Ann Carli, video producer
- 10 Days Out: Blues from the Backroads – Kenny Wayne Shepherd and various artists
  - Noble Jones, video director; Kenny Wayne Shepherd, video producer
- Liberacion: Songs of the Cuban Underground – Various artists
  - Reuben Field, video director; Dean Bates, video producer

== In Memoriam ==
Brad Delp, Boots Randolph, James B. Davis, Max Roach, Robert Goulet, Lee Hazlewood, Pimp C, Gian Carlo Menotti, Joe Zawinul, Joel Dorn, Ray Evans, Lucky Dube, Al Viola, Mstislav Rostropovich, Joel Brodsky, Hilly Kristal, Diane Ogden-Halder, Joe Hunter, Don Ho, Dan Fogelberg, Porter Wagoner, Beverly Sills, Teresa Brewer, Hy Weiss, Tom Noonan, Bobby Byrd, Tommy Makem, John Stewart, Arthur Shimkin, Carlos "Patato" Valdes, Clyde Otis, Luther Ingram, Hank Thompson, Ike Turner, Oscar Peterson and Luciano Pavarotti.
