= Greater Dallas Youth Orchestra =

American orchestra

The Greater Dallas Youth Orchestra (GDYO) is a youth orchestra in Dallas, Texas, US, founded in 1972. GDYO has grown from a single orchestra of 35 members to a program of over 450 members. The principal group is the eponymous symphony, presently under the direction of the maestro Richard Giangiulio. The organization as a whole comprises ten groups, which together provide musical opportunities for students from ages five to eighteen. Auditions are held each spring. Coaches and judges come from the Dallas Symphony Orchestra, Dallas Opera, Dallas Winds, and area universities and orchestras. The ensembles include two full symphonies, flute choir, clarinet choir, wind symphony, three string orchestras, jazz orchestra, and a jazz combo. The mission of Greater Dallas Youth Orchestra is to inspire and cultivate excellence in youth through music education, ensemble building, and performance opportunities.

== Ensemble offerings include ==
- Greater Dallas Youth Orchestra: This full orchestra is the most advanced ensemble in the program and is made up of 104 members, high school seniors or younger. This ensemble has the opportunity, when scheduling and programming align, to perform side by side with the Dallas Symphony Orchestra. Richard Giangiulio, conductor.
- Philharmonic: This full symphony orchestra has approximately 94 members, high school seniors or younger. James Frank, conductor.
- Wind Symphony: The Wind Symphony is an advanced symphonic ensemble of 55 to 62 wind, brass and percussion players who are high school seniors or younger. This ensemble performs an annual side by side with the Dallas Winds, America's premier windband. The Wind Symphony has been invited to perform for the Texas Bandmasters Association on multiple occasions. Jeremy Kondrat, conductor.
- Flute Choir: This group utilizes all instruments in the flute family, including piccolo, C-flute, alto flute, and bass flute. Members are high school seniors or younger. The Flute Choir frequently performs for the National Flute Association Convention. Dr. Priscilla Holt, conductor.
- Sinfonietta: Members of this unique and relatively small string ensemble are in the 11th grade or younger. Susan Younghans, conductor.
- Dallas String Ensemble: An intermediate level string orchestra, the Dallas String Ensemble consists of approximately 65 string players 9th grade or younger. Susan Younghans, conductor.
- Young Performers Orchestra: This ensemble currently consists of 53 string players, 7th grade or younger, and is the first ensemble experience for many of its members. Susan Younghans, conductor.
- GDYO Jazz: This program is made up of both a jazz orchestra and jazz combo. Each student participates in a weekly rehearsal, as well as techniques class where musician learn how they fit and function in a jazz ensemble. Kris Berg conducts the Jazz Orchestra and Dr. Alex Fraile conducts the Jazz Combo.

== Touring ==
Approximately every three to four years the GDYO goes on tour outside North America. In 1998, the orchestra journeyed to England; in 2004 to Poland, Germany, and the Czech Republic; in 2007 to China; in 2012 to Germany, Austria and the Czech Republic; and in 2015 to China for a 5-concert/5-city tour. The Wind Symphony toured Italy in the summer of 2019.

== Honors ==
In 2000, the GDYO was one of five orchestras to qualify for the National Youth Orchestra Festival in Sarasota, Florida.

The GDYO has repeatedly placed members in the recently established National Youth Orchestra of the United States of America including, in the inaugural year, Franklin Jia (clarinet) and Jackie Johnson (bass).
