= Pan's Labyrinth (soundtrack) =

Soundtrack album by Javier Navarrete
- Released: 19 December 2006
- Recorded: 2006
- Studio: Barrandov Studios, Prague, Czech Republic
- Genre: Contemporary classical
- Length: 74:29
- Label: Milan
- Producer: Frida Torresblanco; Javier Ugarte; Ian Hierons (exec.); Jean-Christophe Chamboredon (exec.)

Javier Navarrete chronology
Moscow Zero (2006)	Pan's Labyrinth (2006)	Dance Machine (2006)

Pan's Labyrinth is the soundtrack album to the 2006 film of the same name directed by Guillermo del Toro. The original score was composed by Javier Navarrete which was recorded at the Barrandov Studios in Prague, Czech Republic. The album was initially structured around a lullaby where much of the score had been centered although most of them had been cut during the production. It was released through Milan Records on 19 December 2006 and received an Academy Award nomination for Best Original Score.

== Reception ==
James Christopher Monger of AllMusic wrote "Navarrete fills each cavernous space with wonder, relying on harp, choirs, and deep strings to mirror a young girl's descent into fantasy amidst a world intent on tearing itself apart." Jonathan Broxton of Movie Music UK wrote "In summary, Pan’s Labyrinth is a quite superb score in every respect, and can easily be counted amongst the year’s best efforts. Despite the relative obscurity of the composer, and the art-house sensibilities of the film, the score stands up with the best Hollywood has offered in the last twelve months, and if it score is truly representative of Javier Navarrete’s compositional talents, I sincerely hope he follows the trail blazed by Alexandre Desplat and lends his voice to the mainstream."

The Film Scorer wrote "Composer Javier Navarrete’s score gives a unique identity to each, while simultaneously tying them together with a shared theme." Christian Clemmensen of Filmtracks wrote "The straight horror cues, while terrifyingly unlistenable in some regards, continue to maintain your interest simply because of their seemingly exotic constructs, making Pan's Labyrinth a score, at the very least, worth analysis. On its generous, full-length album, Navarrete's score risks becoming an exhausting listening experience (as it was intended to be), but there are no less than twenty minutes of the more harmonically accessible music for fantasy genre fans to enjoy apart from the dissonant influences. There may be no single cue that will rank among the year's best, but the overall impression that Pan's Labyrinth leaves you with is unmistakably powerful."

However, Spence D. of IGN wrote "despite its darkly tinged romantic nature, the score tends to fall back in on itself a little too much, with many of the songs sounding virtually indiscernible from one another. As a result you often find yourself waiting in earnest for the familiar labyrinth theme to come back and provide you with a sense of wonder and familiarity that breaks up the sometimes monotonous stretches of score sandwiched in the middle of the album." Sean Wilson of MFiles wrote "This is a mesmeric score which pulls you into its world of fantasy – musical story-telling of the highest calibre." Justin Chang of Variety wrote "Javier Navarrete’s supple score proves extraordinarily subtle in conjuring a grim sense of wonder." Andy Trudeau of NPR summarized that "This story of innocence and evil, set in 1930s Spain at the end of that nation's civil war, comes through in a moody, textured soundtrack. Navarette responded to the innocence and drama of the story, centered on a little girl's fantastic daydreams, by making a lullaby at the heart of the score. The theme emerges throughout the film and gets richer and more impassioned in expression as the story progresses."

== Track listing ==
No.	Title	Length
1.	"Long, Long Time Ago" (Hace mucho, mucho tiempo)	2:14
2.	"The Labyrinth" (El laberinto)	4:07
3.	"Rose, Dragon" (La rosa y el dragón)	3:36
4.	"The Fairy and the Labyrinth" (El hada y el laberinto)	3:36
5.	"Three Trials" (Las tres pruebas)	2:06
6.	"The Moribund Tree and the Toad" (El árbol que muere y el sapo)	7:12
7.	"Guerrilleros"	2:06
8.	"A Book of Blood" (El libro de sangre)	3:47
9.	"Mercedes Lullaby" (Nana de Mercedes)	1:39
10.	"The Refuge" (El refugio)	1:32
11.	"Not Human" (El que no es humano)	5:55
12.	"The River" (El río)	2:50
13.	"A Tale" (Un cuento)	1:55
14.	"Deep Forest" (Bosque profundo)	5:48
15.	"Waltz of the Mandrake" (Vals de la mandrágora)	3:42
16.	"The Funeral" (El funeral)	2:45
17.	"Mercedes"	5:37
18.	"Pan and the Full Moon" (La luna llena y el fauno)	5:08
19.	"Ofelia" (Ofelia)	2:19
20.	"A Princess" (Una princesa)	4:03
21.	"Pan's Labyrinth Lullaby" (Nana del laberinto del fauno)	1:47
Total length:		74:29

== Personnel ==
Credits adapted from liner notes:

- Music composer – Javier Navarrete
- Music producers – Frida Torresblanco, Javier Ugarte
- Performer – City Of Prague Philharmonic Orchestra
- Concertino – Bohumil Kotmel
- Conductor – Mario Klemens
- Piano – Jaroslava Eliaasova
- Soloist – Lua
- Recording and mixing – Marc Blanes
- Recording assistance – Michal Hradisk
- Mastering – Christian Dwiggings
- Executive producer – Ian Hierons, Jean-Christophe Chamboredon
- Music business and legal affairs – Roya R. Hekmat, Esq.
- Art direction – Anne Scalco, Jodi Tack
- Cover – Drew Struzan

== Accolades ==
Award	Category	Recipient	Result	Ref.
79th Academy Awards	Best Original Score	Javier Navarrete	Nominated	
Ariel Awards	Best Original Score	Javier Navarrete	Nominated	
21st Goya Awards	Best Original Score	Javier Navarrete	Nominated	
50th Annual Grammy Awards	Best Score Soundtrack for Visual Media	Javier Navarrete	Nominated	
International Cinephile Society	Best Original Score	Javier Navarrete	Nominated	
Online Film Critics Society Awards 2006	Best Original Score	Javier Navarrete	Nominated	
