= Anastasia Khitruk =

Russian-born American violin player

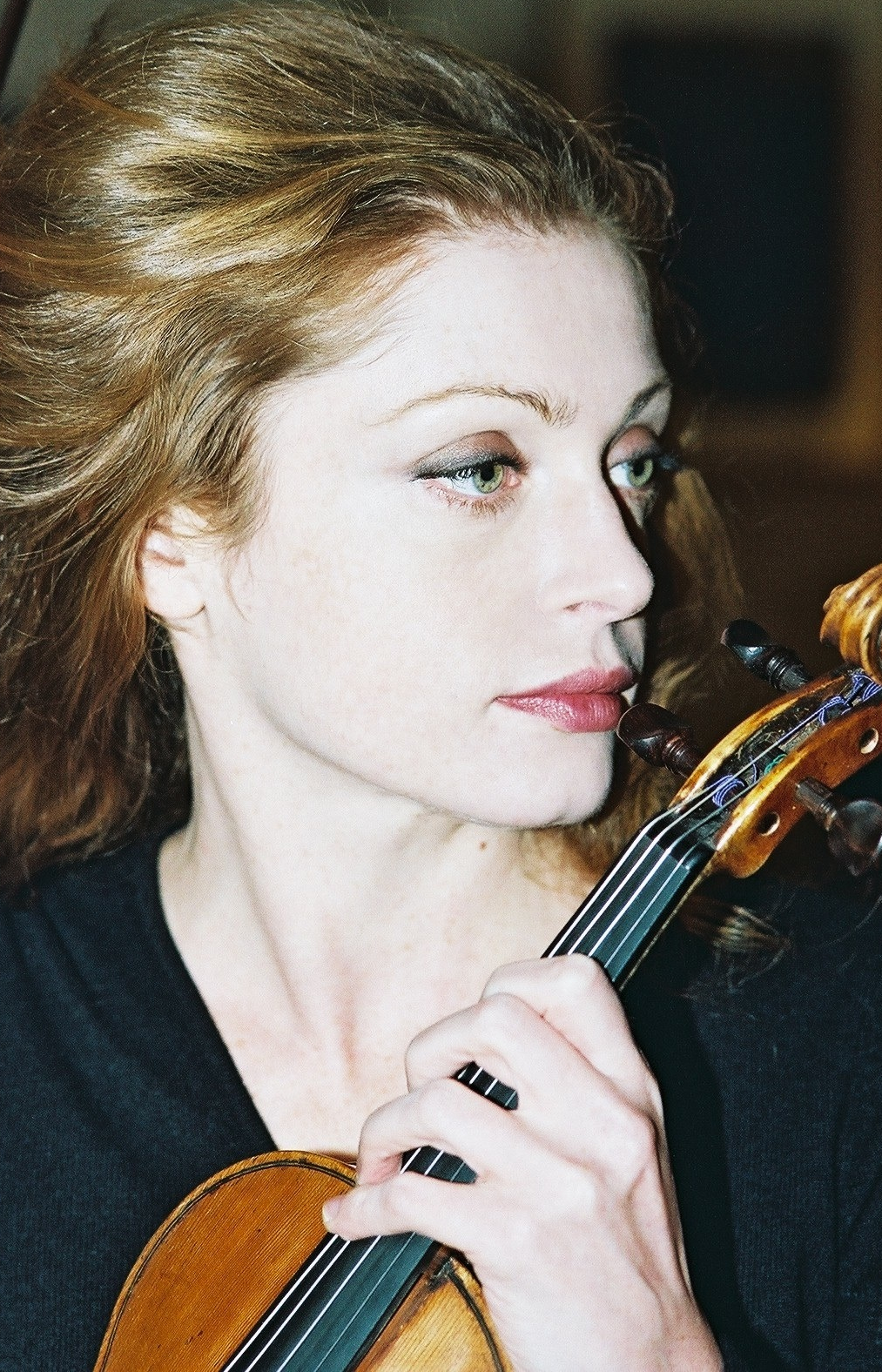
Anastasia Khitruk in 2008

Anastasia Khitruk (Russian: Анастасия Хитрук; born August 1974, in Moscow) is a Russian-born American violin player. She was a student of Dorothy DeLay at the Juilliard School. She has made many recordings of which three were for Naxos: Khandoshkin #8.570028, Miklós Rózsa Violin Concerto #8.570350 (which was nominated for the Grammy Award for Best Instrumental Soloist(s) Performance (with orchestra) at the 50th Annual Grammy Awards in 2008, and Léon de Saint-Lubin #8.572019. Several works were written for Khitruk including Der Golum by Michael Colina.

She was born to piano players Andrey Khitruk and Elena Tatulyan. She is a granddaughter of the animator Fyodor Khitruk.
