= Viola Van Katwijk =

American composer and pianist

Viola Edna Beck Van Katwijk (26 February 1894 – 25 December 1980) was an American composer and pianist. Her music was published under the names Viola Beck and Viola Van Katwijk.

== Early life ==
Van Katwijk was born in Denison, Texas, to German immigrants Mina Frank and Max Oswald Beck. She and her sister Irma studied piano in Berlin with Richard Burmeister. Van Katwijk also studied piano and composition with Percy Grainger.

== Career ==
Van Katwijk made her debut as a solo pianist with the St. Louis Symphony Orchestra in 1914. With her brother Curt, a violinist, she toured as part of the Beck-Allen Trio until her marriage to Paul van Katwijk on July 15, 1922. She joined the piano faculty at Southern Methodist University, where Paul was the dean of the School of Music, and taught there from 1922 until her retirement in 1955. She and her husband also toured as duo pianists.

Van Katwijk composed piano and vocal music. She won the national Mu Phi Epsilon composition contest in 1920 and 1930. She also won two first prizes and one second prize in the San Antonio Club piano composition contest. She was a charter member of the Dallas Music Teachers Association and of the Mu Chi Chapter of the Mu Phi Epsilon music fraternity.

The Paul and Viola van Katwijk Collection is archived at Southern Methodist University. It includes over 100 letters and manuscripts from well-known composers such as Debussy, Mahler, Rachmaninoff and Rossini. Three manuscripts of Van Katwijk's compositions are archived at the Texas Woman's University Library in Denton, Texas.

== Compositions ==
Van Katwijk's compositions include:

=== Piano ===
- Dusk on a Texas Prairie
- Gamelan
- Jester

=== Vocal ===
- "My Terrace"
- "Winter Valley"
