= Richard Giangiulio =

American trumpet player and conductor

Richard Cecil Giangiulio (born November 15, 1942) is an American trumpet player and conductor. Born in Philadelphia, Giangiulio began trumpet at the age of 10. Educated at the Curtis Institute of Music, The Juilliard School, and Conservatoire de Paris, Giangiulio has achieved international acclaim as a soloist and recording artist. After a brief stint with the Israel Philharmonic and a 32-year tenure as principal trumpet of the Dallas Symphony Orchestra, he embarked on a conducting career as founder and music director of the Greater Dallas Youth Orchestra in 1981, a position he presently holds, intermittently returning to the DSO as guest conductor. Giangiulio is also a successful entrepreneur, having maintained a handmade mute company, TrumCor, Inc., since 1995. Currently, Giangiulio resides in Dallas, Texas, with wife, Maria Schleuning, and dogs, Laika (Лайка) and Cairo.

== Early life ==
Richard Giangiulio is the son of Dominique and Jennie Giangiulio. He first began playing at age 10 when he found his grandfather's trumpet in the attic. Giangiulio practiced hours a day as a youth; his motivation is exemplified by his refusal on one occasion to travel to his grandmother's house before successfully playing Clark's "Etude 2" twice in one breath. Early in his musical development, he also made the difficult decision to forfeit his deep love for tennis in order to pursue a professional career in trumpet performance.

== Education ==
At the age of 16, Giangiulio was accepted to the Curtis Institute of Music, where he successfully competed with considerably older and more experienced students. Upon graduation, at 20, he matriculated into the Juilliard School and subsequently obtained a master's degree in trumpet performance. As a Fulbright Scholar, he then attended the Conservatoire de Paris, where he studied under the tutelage of Maurice André.

== Performing career ==
Prior to his acceptance into the Curtis Institute of Music, Giangiulio made his professional debut at 13 with the Philadelphia Orchestra, performing "Showers of Gold." Then, at 14, he won a major competition and was invited to perform "Concert Etude" on a television broadcast. He made the transition to playing in an orchestra when he secured a position in the Israel Philharmonic. Giangiulio was the First Medal winner of the prestigious Geneva International Trumpet Competition in 1967. Two years later he won the audition for principal trumpet of the Dallas Symphony Orchestra, a position he held for 32 years. In addition, he has performed as soloist with the Dallas Symphony, the Knoxville Symphony, and festivals Bachwoche Ansbach, Lucerne, Switzerland, and in Lieksa, Finland.

== Discography ==
Giangiulio has recorded seven albums for Crystal Records, including solo and chamber music. Some of his most notable recordings include "Pistons and Pipes," "Treasures for Horn and Trumpet," and "Music for Festive Occasions." His playing has been praised as "a treasure, filled with [excitement] that will be loved by all brass fans."

== Conducting ==
Giangiulio made the transition to conducting in 1981 when he became music director of the Greater Dallas Youth Orchestra, having had some prior experience as a guest conductor of Dallas Symphony Orchestra children's concerts. Under his leadership, the GDYO has performed major symphonic works and is considered one of the top youth orchestras in the nation.

In addition to conducting, Giangiulio stays active by maintaining a selective private trumpet studio and his mute company.
