= Violin Concerto (Rózsa) =

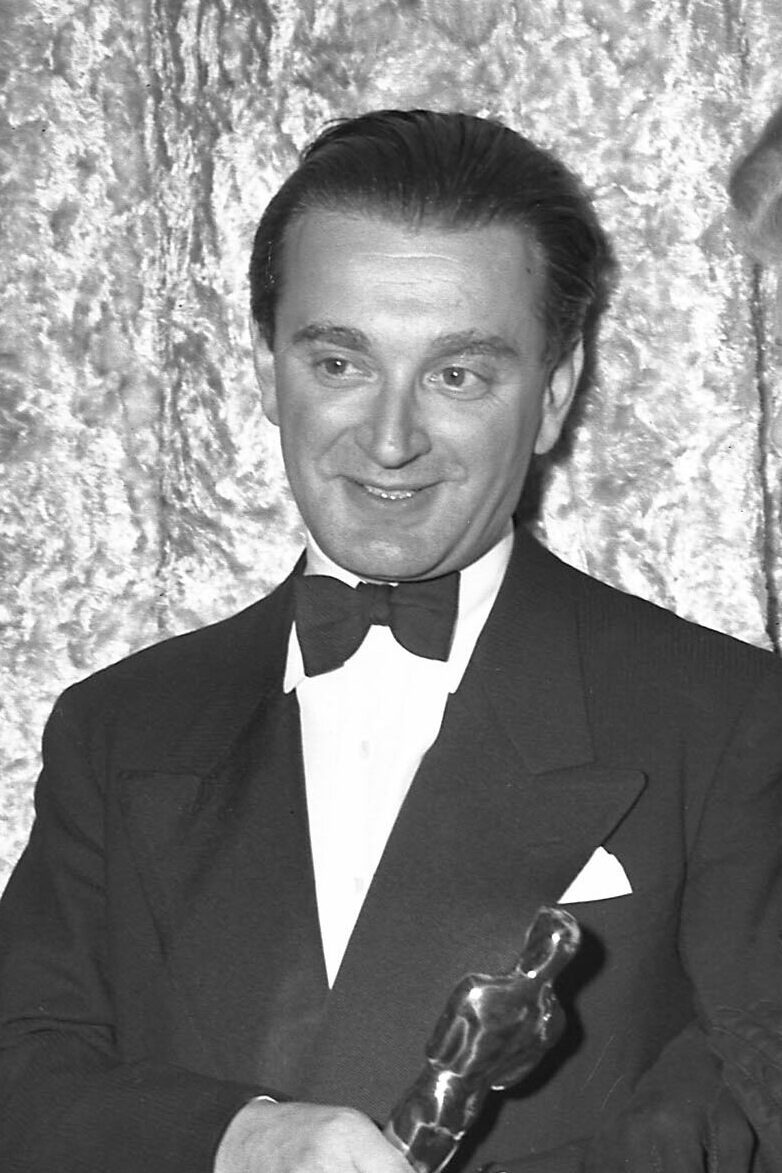
Miklós Rózsa holding his Oscar for Spellbound in 1946

Miklós Rózsa composed his Violin Concerto, Op. 24, in 1953, following a request from the renowned violinist Jascha Heifetz. It premiered on January 15, 1956, in Dallas, Texas, with the Dallas Symphony Orchestra conducted by Walter Hendl, with Heifetz as soloist.

Rózsa adapted the concerto into a score for Billy Wilder's 1970 film The Private Life of Sherlock Holmes. The work is also available in a reduction for violin and piano.

== Structure ==
The concerto is structured in the traditional concerto form of three movements:

1. Allegro non troppo ma passionato
2. Lento cantabile
3. Allegro vivace

The concerto is scored for 2 flutes, 2 oboes, 2 clarinets, 2 bassoons, 4 horns, 2 trumpets, 3 trombones, timpani, glockenspiel, xylophone, snare drum, bass drum, cymbals (both crashed and suspended), celesta, harp, and strings.

== History ==
Rózsa attempted to compose a violin concerto earlier in his career, when he was twenty one, but he abandoned the work because he considered it to be "immature". At the beginning of the 1950s he decided to try again. Reasoning that all great composers had written their concertos with a particular artist in mind, he decided to approach Heifetz. Rózsa met Heifetz only once, being introduced to him shortly after Rózsa's arrival in the United States during a concert at the Hollywood Bowl.

Rózsa knew Heifetz's accompanist, Emmanuel Bay, and he asked him to approach Heifetz on his behalf. He appeared interested, writing to Rózsa to compose only one movement. According to Rózsa's autobiography, Double Life, he considered it to be a risky proposition because Heifetz was known for refusing other composers' works after hearing only one movement.

During his break from MGM in 1953, Rózsa rented a villa in Rapallo, Italy, where he began to write music for the new concerto. At first he wanted to compose only one movement, as Heifetz requested, but he soon decided to compose a full-scale concerto in three movements; the concerto was completed in just six weeks.

When he returned to the United States, Rózsa delivered the manuscript to Emmanuel Bay who offered it to Heifetz for his approval. Heifetz contacted Rózsa saying that he liked the completed work and he suggested that the two should meet in four weeks, after the violinist would return from his concert tour. Six months elapsed without a word from Heifetz, and Rózsa assumed that he had lost interest in their collaboration.

At the suggestion of fellow artists, Rózsa was encouraged to offer his work to other violinists. Before anyone else had an opportunity to accept or decline the invitation, however, Heifetz telephoned. Rózsa, perhaps inappropriately, assumed that the caller was not the great soloist at all but, rather, his friend and fellow composer Bronislau Kaper playing a practical joke on him. Consequently, when Heifetz contacted him by telephone, Rózsa replied "If you’re Heifetz, I’m Mozart." After recovering from what the composer considered one of the most embarrassing moments of his career, discussions proceeded. Heifetz wished to make some minor changes and edits, and Rózsa happily agreed, working together toward a finalized version of the concerto.

Heifetz contacted Rózsa at the end of 1955 telling him that he was prepared to give the concert premiere of the work. The premiere took place on January 15, 1956, in Dallas, Texas, with the Dallas Symphony Orchestra conducted by Walter Hendl, with Heifetz as soloist. At the conclusion of the performance, Heifetz called Rózsa to the stage where both were greeted by a standing ovation. Later that year Heifetz recorded the concerto, teaming again with Hendl and the Dallas Symphony Orchestra.

== Other early performances ==
16 January 1956 (Fort Worth, TX): Heifetz/Hendl/Dallas Symphony (same forces as Dallas premiere a day earlier); 11 June 1956 (Los Angeles): Tossy Spivakovsky; 2 July 1956 (Baden-Baden, Germany): Denes Zsigmondy; 22 October 1956 (Erie, PA): Tossy Spivakovsky; 19 November 1956 (Zurich, Switzerland): Szymon Goldenberg; 9 December 1956 (Frankfurt, Germany): Denes Zsigmondy; 15 December 1956 (Los Angeles): Tossy Spivakovsky; 20 December1956 (Munich, Germany): Denes Zsigmondy

== Notable recordings ==
- Jascha Heifetz with Walter Hendl and the Dallas Symphony Orchestra
- Anastasia Khitruk with Dmitry Yablonsky and the Russian Philharmonic Orchestra (nominated for the Grammy Award for Best Instrumental Soloist(s) Performance (with orchestra) at the 50th Annual Grammy Awards)
- Robert McDuffie with Yoel Levi and the Atlanta Symphony Orchestra
- Igor Gruppman with James Sedares and the New Zealand Symphony Orchestra
- Matthew Trusler with Yasuo Shinozaki and the Düsseldorfer Symphoniker
