= Walter Hendl =

American conductor, composer and pianist

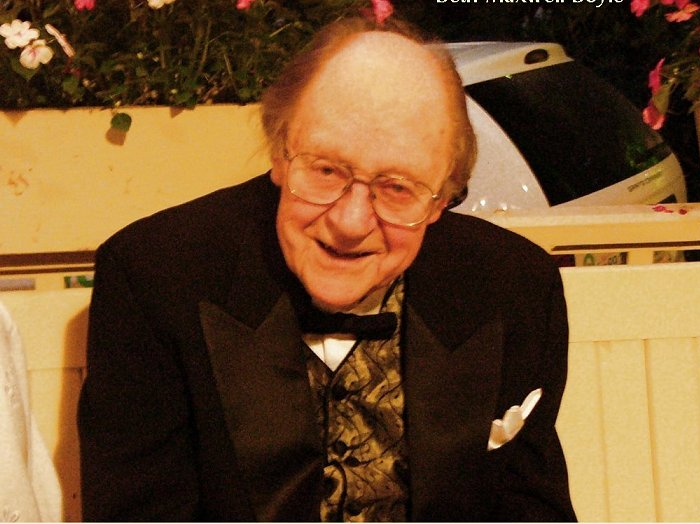
Walter Hendl

Walter Hendl (January 12, 1917 – April 10, 2007) was an American conductor, composer and pianist.

Hendl was born in West New York, New Jersey. He studied at the Curtis Institute of Music and held various conducting and teaching positions throughout his career, including at Sarah Lawrence College, New York Philharmonic, Dallas Symphony Orchestra, Chautauqua Symphony Orchestra, Chicago Symphony Orchestra, Eastman School of Music, and Erie Philharmonic. He also served as the first artistic director of the Ravinia Festival and was a professor of conducting at Mercyhurst College. A supporter of contemporary music, Hendl conducted several premieres and composed incidental music for stage productions. He recorded best-selling albums with RCA Victor, featuring prominent soloists like Jascha Heifetz and Van Cliburn. Hendl died in Pennsylvania after battling heart and lung disease.

== Biography ==
Hendl was born in West New York, New Jersey, and later went on to study with Fritz Reiner at the Curtis Institute of Music in Philadelphia. From 1939 to 1941 he taught at Sarah Lawrence College in Yonkers, New York. In 1941 and 1942, he was a pianist and conductor at the Berkshire Music Center under Serge Koussevitzky. In 1945, he became associate conductor of the New York Philharmonic. In 1949, he was appointed music director of the Dallas Symphony Orchestra, where he conducted Jascha Heifetz in the premiere of Miklós Rózsa's Violin Concerto, and he held this position until 1958. In 1953, Hendl became the music director of the Chautauqua Symphony Orchestra. He remained with Chautauqua until temporary ill health necessitated his resignation in 1972. He was also active in the Symphony of the Air and conducted its 1955 tour of east Asia.

In 1958, Reiner appointed Hendl associate conductor of the Chicago Symphony Orchestra, and he served in this post until 1964. At the same time, he was the first artistic director of the Ravinia Festival and served there from 1959 to 1963. He left the Chicago Symphony Orchestra in 1964. From 1964 to 1972, Hendl served as director of the Eastman School of Music at Rochester, New York, and was also musical adviser to the Rochester Philharmonic Orchestra and its part-time conductor.

In 1976 Hendl was appointed music director of the Erie Philharmonic in Erie, Pennsylvania. In 1990, he became professor of conducting at Mercyhurst College in Erie. An advocate of contemporary music, he conducted the premieres of Peter Mennin's Symphony No. 3 with the New York Philharmonic Orchestra in 1947, Bohuslav Martinů's Piano Concerto No. 3 with Rudolf Firkušný and the Dallas Symphony in 1949, Villa-Lobos's Cello Concerto No. 2 with Aldo Parisot and the New York Philharmonic Orchestra in 1954, and the American premiere of Kabalevsky's Requiem with students of the Eastman School in 1965. He composed incidental music for various stage productions and made several orchestral transcriptions.

He was inducted as a National Patron of Delta Omicron, an international professional music fraternity on December 1, 1960.

His best-selling recordings for RCA Victor include violin concerti featuring Jascha Heifetz, Henryk Szeryng, and Erick Friedman and piano concerti featuring Van Cliburn and Gary Graffman.

Hendl died in Harborcreek Township, Pennsylvania.

Hendl's daughter, Susan Hendl, was a ballet dancer.

Cultural offices
Preceded by Howard Hanson	Director of the Eastman School of Music; 1964-1972	Succeeded by Daniel Patrylak (Acting Director)
Preceded by Howard Hanson	Director of the Eastman School of Music; 1964-1972	Succeeded by Robert Freeman (musician)
Preceded by Howard Hanson	Director of the Eastman School of Music; 1964–1972	Succeeded by Daniel Patrylak (Acting Director)
