= Emanuel Borok =

American violinist (1944–2020)

Emanuel Borok (July 15, 1944 – January 4, 2020) was an American violinist of Soviet descent.

== Early life and education ==
Born in Tashkent, then in the Uzbek Soviet Socialist Republic, part of the Soviet Union, Borok grew up in a Jewish family that spoke Yiddish at home and during his early childhood moved to Riga, then part of the Latvian Socialist Soviet Republic. His father was a clock-maker. When Borok was five, his father's cousin, a piano teacher, had suggested that Borok learn an instrument like the piano; however, his father disliked that instrument and very much preferred the violin, which Borok took up. He studied violin in Riga with Voldemar Sturestep, who later taught Gidon Kremer, at the Emils Darzins School of Music. In 1959, he joined the Gnessin Music School in Moscow, where he continued his studies with Michael Garlitsky.

== Career ==
Borok won top prizes in the All-Russian Republic and All-Soviet Union violin competitions. He became second concertmaster of the Moscow Philharmonic Orchestra in 1971. He then left the Soviet Union, later saying that he wanted the freedom to choose the way he wanted to live "artistically, civilly, and humanistically. In the Soviet Union I had no life whatsoever. I was successful and well off, yet I had no future as a Jew, as an intellectual". In 1973, he emigrated to Israel, where he became concertmaster of the Israel Chamber Orchestra.

In 1974, he emigrated to the United States, to take the post of associate concertmaster of the Boston Symphony Orchestra. In parallel, he was concertmaster of the Boston Pops. Borok spent 11 years in his Boston posts. He also taught at Boston University from 1976 to 1985. In 1985, he won the position of concertmaster in the Dallas Symphony Orchestra, and joined the Dallas Symphony that year. He initially performed on a Stradivarius violin dating from ca. 1727, owned by the Dallas Symphony, until its theft that year whilst he and the orchestra were on tour. The violin was not recovered until 2005. Subsequently, Borok performed on a 1608 Brothers Amati violin that he had bought around 1976. That violin was smashed in a 1992 car crash in which Borok's right arm was broken in two places; it took several months for both the violin and violinist to recover On the occasion of the violin's 400th "birthday", in 2009 Borok went to the town of its creation, Cremona, Italy, and presented it in concert for the people of the city, recorded in the documentary A Cremona con Amore. Borok served as Dallas Symphony concertmaster until his retirement in 2010.

In 2011, Borok was the principal violinist for the Maui Classical Music Festival on Maui, Hawaii for its 30th season.

Borok taught at the Moores School of Music at the University of Houston. From 2006 to 2013, he had a teaching position at the University of North Texas. In 2013, he joined the violin faculty at the Meadows School of the Arts of Southern Methodist University as a distinguished artist-in-residence, having previously taught there since the 1980s.

== Personal life ==
Borok died in Dallas on January 4, 2020, at age 75, from lung cancer. He was married twice: to Zinaida (née Shektman), with whom he had a son and a daughter, and to Marilyn until his death.He married Zinaida, also Jewish, in Moscow in the mid-1960s in a civil Soviet ceremony. The marriage was illegal under Jewish law because it occurred on a Saturday, the Jewish Shabbat, the only day on which weddings were conducted in that city. In 1982, the couple re-married in a mass traditional Jewish wedding with 59 other Soviet Jewish couples in Boston conducted by Rabbi Richard Yellin at the Newton synagogue, Congregation Mishkan Tefila. At this ceremony He performed Ernest Bloch's setting of the Nigun movement from the suite "Baal Shem". He said of the mass wedding: "it is a way of saying that I'm a Jew, that I've arrived and I treasure my religious connection, something which was never allowed to be a matter of public honor in the Soviet Union."

His papers are at the University of North Texas Music Library.
