= Alexander Kerr (professor) =

American violinist

Alexander Kerr (born 1970) is an American violinist. He is currently the Linda and Jack Gill Chair in Music at Jacobs School of Music, Indiana University, and the concertmaster of the Dallas Symphony Orchestra. He was formerly the concertmaster of the Royal Concertgebouw Orchestra, the Cincinnati Symphony Orchestra, and the Charleston Symphony Orchestra.
