= Company (2006 Broadway revival cast recording) =

Company – A Musical Comedy

Cast recording by various artists
- Released: February 20, 2007
- Studio: Sear Sound Studios, New York
- Label: Nonesuch, PS Classics

A recording of Stephen Sondheim and George Furth's musical Company made by its 2006 Broadway revival cast, with Raúl Esparza in the lead role, was released on CD by Nonesuch Records and PS Classics on February 20, 2007.

The album was nominated for the Grammy in the Best Musical Show Album category.

== Background ==
The album was recorded at the Sear Sound Studios in New York City on December 18–19, 2006. The recording was produced by Tommy Krasker, a co-founder of the record label PS Classics.

== Critical reception ==
Professional ratings
Review scores
Source	Rating
AllMusic	4/5 stars

In his review for AllMusic, William Ruhlmann notes that even though "the original Broadway cast album of [the musical] has yet to be bettered, in part because it continues to seem a definitive treatment of the score", "[the new] version is also very good and offers some slight differences to recommend it." He also commends Esparza and "the other 13 performers" for "sing[ing] emotionally and well".

== Track listing ==
CD – Nonesuch 106876-2

All lyrics are written by Stephen Sondheim; all music is composed by Stephen Sondheim.

No.	Title	Performed by	Length
1.	"Opening"	Company	2:28
2.	"Company"	Robert, Company	4:37
3.	"The Little Things You Do Together"	Joanne, Sarah, Harry, Robert, Company	3:52
4.	"Sorry-Grateful"	Harry, David, Larry	3:43
5.	"You Could Drive a Person Crazy"	April, Kathy, Marta, Robert, David	3:16
6.	"Have I Got a Girl for You?"	Larry, Peter, Paul, David, Harry, Company	2:31
7.	"Someone Is Waiting"	Robert	2:46
8.	"Another Hundred People"	Marta, April, Robert, Kathy	5:55
9.	"Getting Married Today"	Amy, Paul, Susan, Robert, Company	4:05
10.	"„What did I just do?“"	Amy, Robert, Company	1:31
11.	"Marry Me a Little"	Robert	3:53
12.	"Side by Side by Side"	Robert, Company	4:11
13.	"What Would We Do Without You"	Robert, Company	4:27
14.	"Poor Baby"	Sarah, Harry, Jenny, David, Susan, Amy, Joanne	2:54
15.	"Barcelona"	Robert, April	3:28
16.	"The Ladies Who Lunch"	Joanne	4:18
17.	"„You have a good third husband, Joanne“"	Robert, Joanne, Larry, Company	2:59
18.	"Being Alive"	Robert, Company	5:07

== Awards ==
Year	Award type	Categories	Results	Ref.
2008	Grammy Awards	Best Musical Show Album	Nominated	
