= Dallas Symphony Orchestra =

Orchestra

Dallas Symphony Orchestra (DSO)
- Orchestra
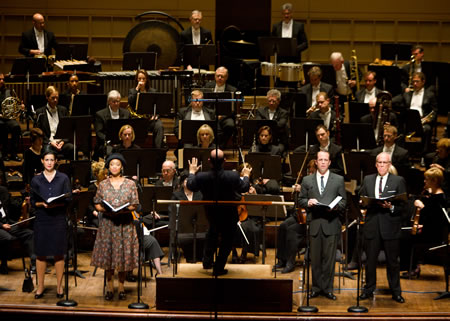
- Founded: 1900
- Location: Dallas, Texas, United States
- Concert hall: Morton H. Meyerson Symphony Center
- Music director: Fabio Luisi
- Website: www.dallassymphony.org

The Dallas Symphony Orchestra (DSO) is an American orchestra based in Dallas, Texas. Its principal performing venue is the Morton H. Meyerson Symphony Center in the Arts District of downtown Dallas.

== History ==
The orchestra traces its origins to a concert given by a group of forty musicians in 1900 with conductor Hans Kreissig. It continued to perform and grow in numbers and stature, so that in 1945 it was in a position to appoint Antal Doráti as music director. Under Doráti, the orchestra became fully professional. Several times during the history of the orchestra it has suspended operations, including periods during the First and Second World Wars from 1914 to 1918 and from 1942 to 1945, and more recently in 1974 due to fiscal restraints. In 1956, Walter Hendl conducted Jascha Heifetz in the premiere of Miklós Rózsa's Violin Concerto. Subsequent music directors have included Georg Solti, Anshel Brusilow, and Eduardo Mata. Andrew Litton was music director from 1994 to 2006. During Litton's tenure, the orchestra recorded the four Rachmaninoff piano concerti and the Rhapsody on a Theme of Paganini with Stephen Hough for Hyperion Records, as well as the symphonies of Charles Ives. One critic wrote that their recording of Mahler's Third Symphony "may well be the best integrated view of the work, as a totality, ever to have come along."

In 2007, Jaap van Zweden was named the DSO's 15th music director, and began his tenure in the 2008–2009 season with an initial contract of four years. In October 2009, the orchestra announced the extension of van Zweden's contract through the 2015–2016 season. In November 2013, the orchestra announced a further extension of van Zweden's contract through 2019. In January 2016, the orchestra announced the rescheduled conclusion of van Zweden's tenure as music director after the 2017–2018 season, after which time he was scheduled to serve as the orchestra's conductor laureate from 2018 through 2021.

In 2002, Fabio Luisi first guest-conducted the orchestra. His next Dallas guest-conducting appearance was in March 2018. On the basis of this guest-conducting engagement, in June 2018, the orchestra named Luisi its next music director, effective with the 2020–2021 season. He held the title of music director-designate in the 2019–2020 season. In January 2021, the orchestra announced the extension of Luisi's contract as music director through 2029.

In October 2018, the orchestra announced the appointment of Gemma New as its next principal guest conductor, the first female conductor to hold the title, effective with the 2019–2020 season. In December 2021, the orchestra extended New's contract as principal guest conductor through the 2022–2023 season. In May 2023, the orchestra announced the appointment of Enrico Lopez-Yañez as principal conductor of the Dallas Symphony Presents and Anthony Blake Clark as the new Chorus Director.

Past presidents and chief executive officers of the orchestra have included Kim Noltemy. In June 2024, the orchestra announced the appointment of Michelle Miller Burns as its next president and chief executive officer, effective 23 September 2024.

== Music directors ==
- Hans Kreissig (1900–1901)
- Walter Fried (1911)
- Carl Venth (1911–1914)
- Walter Fried (1918–1924)
- Paul van Katwijk (1925–1936)
- Jacques Singer (1937–1942)
- Antal Doráti (1945–1949)
- Walter Hendl (1949–1958)
- Paul Kletzki (1958–1961)
- Georg Solti (1961–1962)
- Donald Johanos (1962–1970)
- Anshel Brusilow (1970–1973)
- Max Rudolf (1973–1974)
- Eduardo Mata (1977–1993)
- Andrew Litton (1994–2006)
- Jaap van Zweden (2008–2018)
- Fabio Luisi (2020–present)

== Musicians ==
Members of the Dallas Symphony Orchestra with articles in English Wikipedia include:

- Ryan Anthony, trumpet 2004–2020, principal 2006–2020
- Lev Aronson, cello 1948–1967, principal 1949–1967
- Madeleine Begun, oboe c. 1969–1970
- David Bilger, trumpet, principal c. 1990–1995
- Emanuel Borok, violin, concertmaster 1985–2010
- Rafael Druian, violin, concertmaster 1947–1949
- Willard Somers Elliot, bassoon 1951–1964, principal 1956–1964
- Jules Eskin, cello 1948–1949
- Walter Fried, violin, concertmaster 1911–1914 (also music director)
- Richard Giangiulio, trumpet, principal 1969–2001
- Everett M. Gilmore, tuba, principal, 1965–1995
- Joseph Hawthorne, viola, principal 1945–1949 (also associate conductor)
- Frank Kaderabek, trumpet, principal 1953–1958
- Alexander Kerr, violin, concertmaster 2011–present
- David Kim, violin, senior associate concertmaster 1997–1999
- William Kraft, percussion 1954–1955
- Andreas Makris, violin, principal second 1958–1959
- Demarre McGill, flute, principal 2013–2016
- Mitchell Peters, percussion, principal c. 1959–1969
- Robert Xavier Rodriguez, composer in residence 1982–1983
- David Shifrin, clarinet, principal 1970s
- János Starker, cello, principal 1948–1949
- Carl Venth, violin, concertmaster 1927–1931 (also music director)
- Ernst Wallfisch, viola, assistant principal 1947–1949
- Harold Wright, clarinet, principal 1952–mid-1950s?
