= Paul van Katwijk =

American classical composer

Paul van Katwijk (December 7, 1885 – December 11, 1974) was a Dutch-American pianist, conductor, composer, and music educator. He was an important figure in the classical music culture of Dallas, Texas, for much of the 20th century. He served as the music director of the Dallas Symphony Orchestra for eleven years.

== Early life and musical training ==
Paulus van Katwijk was born in Delfshaven in the Netherlands on December 7, 1885, to Johannes van Katwijk and Catharina Scholten. He was a pupil of Carl Oberstadt (who was in turn a student of Robert and Clara Schumann) at the Royal College of Music in The Hague, Netherlands. He subsequently studied in Vienna and Berlin with the eminent pianist Leopold Godowsky.

== Career ==
Following several years of teaching in Europe, during which van Katwijk had begun to develop a reputation as a fine teacher, he came to the United States in 1912. He was appointed to the piano faculty of Christian College in Columbia, Missouri, then to similar positions at the University of Chicago and at Drake University in Des Moines, Iowa.

In 1918 van Katwijk accepted the post of head of the piano department at Southern Methodist University in Dallas. He would remain on the SMU faculty until 1955. He served as dean of the school of music from 1919 until 1949, then as head of the piano department for the remaining six years of his tenure. He continued teaching piano privately for the remainder of his life. A great number of van Katwijk's students had successful professional musical careers as soloists and teachers.

Throughout his years in Dallas, van Katwijk remained highly active as a performing artist. In the late 1910s he recorded many piano rolls for the Imperial Player Roll Co. of Chicago. He performed as a soloist with orchestras including the Houston, Minneapolis, New Orleans, and Saint Louis Symphonies, and performed recitals throughout the United States, both as a soloist and in a piano duo with his wife, Viola Beck Van Katwijk. Paul van Katwijk was called "a most remarkable pianist" by the great Finnish composer Jean Sibelius.

Van Katwijk was also noted as a conductor. While teaching at Drake, he conducted the Des Moines Symphony, and during his years in Texas he was the music director of the Dallas Symphony from 1925 to 1936. He also conducted the Dallas Oratorio Society, the Dallas Civic Opera, and the Dallas Municipal Chorus.

Van Katwijk composed many works of which over a dozen were published. His "Hollandia Suite" was performed at the Hollywood Bowl and by the Wiesbaden Symphony Orchestra in Germany, and was also played for a national radio broadcast by the Groningen Symphony Orchestra in the Netherlands.

Van Katwijk was active in numerous professional societies and organizations, often serving in leadership positions. In 1962 he was honored as Teacher of the Year by the Texas Music Teachers Association.

== Personal ==
Paul van Katwijk married pianist Viola Beck in 1922. Like her husband, Beck was a composer and a member of the piano faculty at Southern Methodist University. Paul and Viola van Katwijk toured extensively as a duo-piano team.

Paul van Katwijk died in Dallas in 1974 at the age of 89. The van Katwijks had no children.

== Sources ==
- "Dr. van Katwijk, Pianist, Dies." The Dallas Morning News, 12 December 1974.
- "Professor and Mrs. Katwijk Return from Honeymoon." The Dallas Morning News, 25 July 1922.
