= Lydia Kunz Venth =

American composer and pianist

Lydia Kunz Venth (1858 – 23 May 1931) was an American composer and pianist.

Venth was born in Pennsylvania to John Jacob and Henrietta Schlatter Kunz. She was a largely self-taught pianist and composer who married violinist Carl Venth when she was 18 years old. They had a daughter named Elsa, and later divorced.

Lydia and Carl established the Venth Music School in Brooklyn in 1888. Lydia worked as an accompanist and taught piano at the school and privately after she and Carl divorced. He remarried in 1899 and moved to Texas.

Lydia's compositions for piano and organ include:

- Air de Ballet
- Barcarolle
- Brooklet
- Chanson du Berçeau
- Evening
- Lilalith
- Mazurka
- Moments Musicale
- Pieviot
- Serenta
- Sonatina
- Spring Song
