= Kenneth Slowik =

American cellist, viol player, conductor, curator, and artistic director

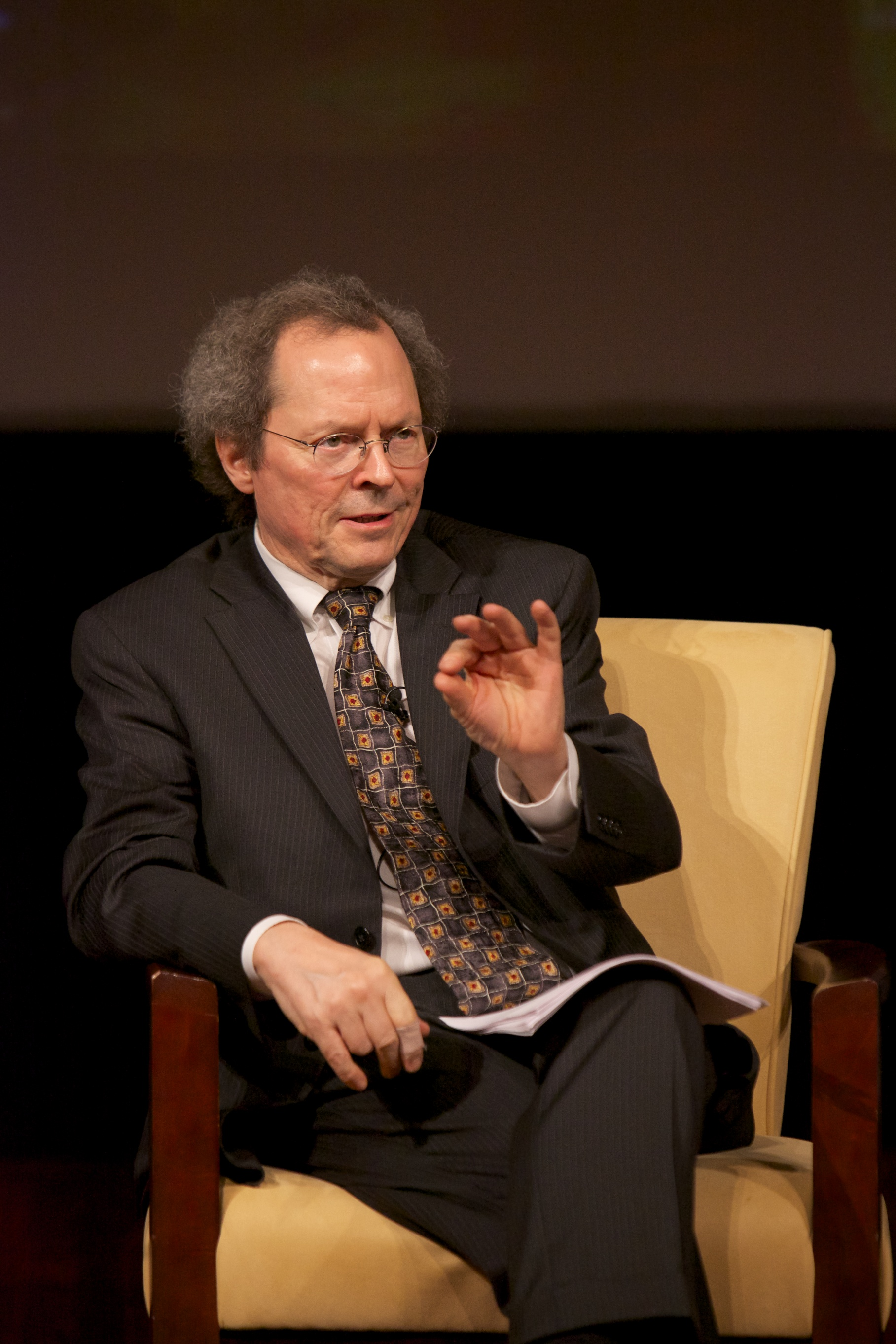
- Born: 1954 (age 71–72)
- Education: University of Chicago, Chicago Musical College, Peabody Conservatory, Salzburg Mozarteum, Vienna Hochschule für Musik
- Occupations: Cellist, viol player, conductor, Curator of Musical Instrument Collection, Artistic Director
- Years active: 1988-present
- Employer(s): Smithsonian Chamber Music Society, National Museum of American History

Kenneth Slowik (born 1954) is an American cellist, viol player, and conductor. Curator of Musical Instrument Collection at the National Museum of American History and Artistic Director of the Smithsonian Chamber Music Society. He took an interest in music and organology from an early age. He studied at the University of Chicago, the Chicago Musical College, the Peabody Conservatory, the Salzburg Mozarteum and, as a Fulbright Scholar, the Vienna Hochschule für Musik, guided by (among others) Howard Mayer Brown, Nikolaus Harnoncourt, Antonio Janigro, Edward Lowinsky, and Frederik Prausnitz.

Slowik first established his international reputation primarily as a cellist and viola da gamba player through his work with the Smithsonian Chamber Players, Castle Trio, Smithson String Quartet, Axelrod Quartet, and with Anner Bylsma’s L’Archibudelli. Conductor of the Smithsonian Chamber Orchestra since 1988, he became conductor of the Santa Fe Bach Festival in 1998, and led the Santa Fe Pro Musica Chamber Orchestra from 1999 to 2004. He has been a soloist and/or conductor with numerous other orchestras, including the National Symphony, the Baltimore, Vancouver, and Québec Symphonies, the Filharmonia Sudecka, the Pleven Philharmonic, and the Cleveland Orchestra. His involvement with 20th-century art music included many seasons with Ralph Shapey’s Contemporary Chamber Players and founding membership in the Chicago Museum of Contemporary Art’s resident ensemble “Twittering Machine.”

He has appeared in hundreds of concerts with SCMS ensembles and made over sixty recordings, featuring him as a conductor, cellist, gambist, barytonist and keyboard player for music ranging from the Baroque (Marais, Corelli, Bach) through the Classical (Haydn, Boccherini, Beethoven, Schubert) and Romantic (Mendelssohn, Gade, Spohr) to the early twentieth century (Schönberg, Mahler, Richard Strauss). Of these, many have won prestigious international awards, including France’s Diapason d'Or and Choc, the “British Music Retailers’ Award for Excellence,” Italy’s Premio Internazionale del Disco Antonio Vivaldi, two GRAMMY® nominations, and numerous “Record of the Month” and “Record of the Year” prizes.

A notable scholar and educator, Slowik has presented lectures and seminars throughout the United States. His articles on music and performance practice have appeared in several scholarly journals; his annotations for recordings and concert programs are frequently cited as models in their field. In 2011 he received the Smithsonian Secretary's Distinguished Research Lecture Award. Slowik serves on the faculties of L’Académie Internationale du Domaine Forget in Québec and the University of Maryland; he has been the Artistic Director of the Baroque Performance Institute at the Oberlin College Conservatory since 1993.

== Selected discography ==
- Symphony No. 4 in G Major (arranged for chamber orchestra by Erwin Stein) and Lieder eines fahrenden Gesellen [Songs of a Wayfarer] (arranged for chamber orchestra by Arnold Schönberg), by Gustav Mahler (dir.). The Smithsonian Chamber Players and Santa Fe Pro Musica, with Christine Brandes, soprano, and Susan Platts, mezzo-soprano (2003)
- Verklärte Nacht by Arnold Schoenberg; Adagietto by Gustav Maher; Quartetto Serioso, Op. 95 by Ludwig van Beethoven, arranged for string orchestra by Gustav Mahler (dir.). The Smithsonian Chamber Players (1996)
- Quintets, Opp. 38, 39, & 40 by Georges Onslow (cellist). The Smithsonian Chamber Players and L’Archibudelli (1995)
- Metamorphosen by Richard Strauss; Serenade and Elegy by Edward Elgar; Adagio for Strings by Samuel Barber (dir.). The Smithsonian Chamber Players (1995)
- Concerts Royaux and Pièces à deux clavecins by François Couperin (viola da gamba and harpsichord). The Smithsonian Chamber Players (1994)
- Trio in E-flat Major, D929 and Sonatensatz, D28 by Franz Schubert (cello). The Castle Trio (1993)
- The Complete Piano Trios of Ludwig van Beethoven (cello). The Castle Trio. (1990, 1991, 1993, 1989)
- Octet, Op. 20, by Felix Mendelssohn; Octet, Op. 17, by Neils Gade (cello). Smithsonian Chamber Players and L’Archibudelli (1992)
- String Quintets, Op. 11, Nos. 4–6 by Luigi Boccherini (cello). The Smithsonian Chamber Players (1991)
- Quintet in C Major, D956 by Franz Schubert (cello). Smithsonian Chamber Players and L’Archibudelli (1991)
- Pièces à deux violes of 1686 by Marin Marais (viola da gamba). The Smithsonian Chamber Players (1990)
- St. John Passion, BWV 245, by Johann Sebastian Bach (dir.). The Smithsonian Chamber Players and Smithsonian Chamber Chorus (1990)
- The Twelve Trio Sonatas of Op. 3 by Arcangelo Corelli (cello). The Smithsonian Chamber Players (1989)
- String Quartets Op. 54, Nos. 1 & 2 by Joseph Haydn (cello). The Smithson String Quartet (1989)
- Trio in G Minor, Op. 15 by Bedrich Smetana; Dumky Trio by Antonín Dvořák (cello). The Castle Trio (1988)
- Adrien-François Servais, Souvenirs and Caprices (cello). The Smithsonian Chamber Players (1988)
- String Quartets Op. 77, Nos. 1 & 2 and Op. 103 (cello). The Smithson String Quartet (1988)
- String Quartets, Op. 18, Nos. 1–6 by Ludwig van Beethoven (cello). The Smithson String Quartet (1988)
- Sonatas for Piano and Violoncello, Op. 5, Nos 1 & 2 by Ludwig van Beethoven (cello, with James Weaver, fortepiano) (1988)
