= Madeleine Begun Kane =

American political satirist

Madeleine Begun Kane is a humorist and political satirist who sometimes writes under the name Mad Kane. She won the 2008 Robert Benchley Society Humor Award and has been a National Society of Newspaper Columnists award winner. Her humor and essays have been published in newspapers and print magazines, on websites, and in textbooks and anthologies, including Laughing Matters, Life's a Stitch: The Best of Contemporary Women's Humor, Funny Times: The Best of the Best American Humor, Jest Patriotic, Cash In on Laughter, Big Bush Lies, I Killed June Cleaver, Minutes of the Lead Pencil Club, Healer (Archetypes of the Collective Unconscious Volume 2), and Pearson's The Contemporary Reader. She is also a former lawyer.

Dubya's Dayly Diary (her ghostwritten satirical White House diary of George W. Bush) was named among The Guardian's Best George Bush Websites, and described as "thick on the domestic politics and the Texan accent, but not so good on the character humour".

Kane studied at the Eastman School of Music, the Aspen Music Festival, California Institute of the Arts, and St. John's University School of Law. She earned her BFA in music performance (oboe) from Cal Arts in 1971 and her J.D. from St. John's University School of Law in 1979.

Kane lives in Bayside, Queens, with her husband, Mark Kane, and she publishes the humor site MadKane.com.
