= Hans Kreissig =

Hans Kreissig (May 23, 1857 – December 28, 1929) was a German-born American pianist, music teacher, and conductor. He is noted for establishing the Dallas Symphony Orchestra in 1900 and for serving as its first music director.

== Career ==
Hans Kreissig was born in Germany, the son of Gustav and Marie Kreissig. His early musical training was in Germany; this was followed by several years studying composition and conducting with Arthur Sullivan in London. Early in his career he was the accompanist for Jules Levy, a noted English cornet player. Kreissig first came to the United States in 1883, with a touring opera company, and in 1884 he settled in Dallas, Texas. There he taught piano and organ, and also directed choirs at several churches and synagogues. By 1886, he had been appointed conductor of the Dallas Frohsinn, a male chorus. In December 1886 the Frohsinn offered Kreissig thirty dollars a month and a guarantee of twelve private students if he would remain in Dallas as conductor; he held that position until 1912. The Frohsinn was a prominent part of Dallas's musical life in the late 19th and early 20th centuries: it was featured in local presentations of opera and symphonic music as well as its own concerts, and it made several performance tours throughout Texas. In addition to the Frohsinn, Kreissig organized and conducted a number of band and orchestra concerts in the 1880s and 1890s, and he later founded the Beethoven Trio and the Phoenix Club (a chamber ensemble). Kreissig's promotion of the arts in Dallas also included fundraising, which he did on foot among the city's merchants.

In 1900, Kreissig formed the original Dallas Symphony Orchestra, which presented its first concert in May of that year, featuring Haydn's "Oxford" Symphony No. 92. He conducted one more concert, in 1901, after which the orchestra suspended operations. Although the DSO has since evolved in numerous fundamental ways, including temporary name changes and several multiyear periods of dormancy, the present organization still traces its origins to Kreissig's 1900 ensemble, as it is stated in the notes accompanying DSO 100, a commemorative CD issued by the Dallas Symphony in 2000.

Following Kreissig's 1912 retirement from the leadership of the Frohsinn, he taught piano privately in Dallas until his death in 1929.

== Personal life ==
Kreissig married Louise Cretien, a native of the Texas French settlement La Reunion, in 1893. They had two children.

== Sources ==
- Albrecht, Theodore. "Kreissig, Hans" in The Handbook of Texas Music, ed. Roy Barkley et al. Austin: Texas State Historical Association, 2003. ISBN 0-87611-194-0.
- DSO 100: Celebrating the Century with the Dallas Symphony Orchestra (liner notes). Dallas Symphony Orchestra, 2000.
- "Large Crowd Says Good-Bye to Symphony" by John Rosenfield, Jr. Dallas Morning News, 14 April 1930.
- "Mrs. Kreissig, 90, Lifetime Resident, Dies." Dallas Morning News, 26 August 1960.
- "Music Shows Rapid Development in Dallas During Last Few Decades." Dallas Morning News, 6 August 1922.
- "Present Orchestra Stands as Monument to Late Walter Fried." Dallas Morning News, 20 November 1927.
- Texas Death Certificate
- United States Censuses, 1920 and 1930. Accessed via heritagequestonline.com.
- Vital Records – Dallas County, TX – Deaths 1982. Accessed via ftp.rootsweb.com.
