= Carl Venth =

American classical composer

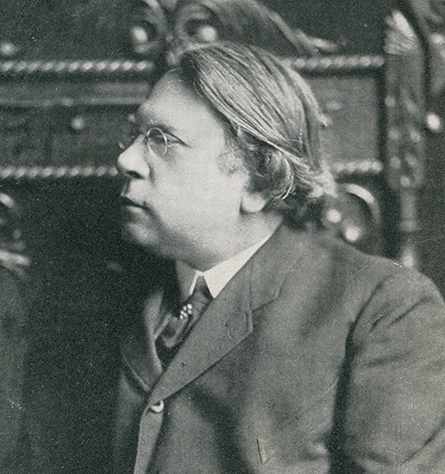
Portrait of violinist, composer, and conductor Carl Venth

Carl Venth (February 16, 1860 – January 29, 1938) was a German-American composer, violinist, conductor, music educator, and scholar. He was a leading classical music figure in Texas in the first half of the twentieth century and was one of the early music directors of the Dallas Symphony Orchestra.

== Early life and education ==
Venth was born in Cologne, Kingdom of Prussia, the son of Carl Venth and Friderika von Turkowitz. He began learning the violin at age 9 with his father. Carl studied at the Friedrich Wilhelm-Gymnasium; at the Cologne Conservatory, where he learned the violin with George Japha and composition with Ferdinand Hiller, Gustav Jensen, and Otto Klauwell; and at the Brussels Conservatory, where he studied violin with Henryk Wieniawski and from which he graduated in 1877.

== Career ==
In 1878 Venth was appointed concertmaster of the Utrecht Symphony Orchestra and of the Flemish Opera in Brussels; in 1879 he assumed the same post with the Offenbach Comic Opera of Paris. He made his solo debut in 1878 with the Utrecht Symphony, followed by a concert tour of the Netherlands in 1879 (together with Alfred Patzig and Luise Wandersleb-Patzig, 16 concerts in 12 cities) and of the United States in 1880.

In 1880, he moved to the United States whereupon he concertized as a violin soloist for four years before accepting a position in the orchestra of the Metropolitan Opera in New York City. He lived in New York until 1908. During that time, he founded the Venth College of Music in Brooklyn (1889) with his first wife, composer and pianist Lydia Kunz Venth, with whom he had a daughter, Elsa. He founded and conducted the Brooklyn Symphony Orchestra in 1890, founded and led the Venth String Quartet in 1891, and served as conductor or concertmaster with the Euterpe Orchestral Society of New York and the St. Paul Symphony.

He divorced Lydia and in 1899 married Cathinka Finch Myhr of Norway.

In 1908 Venth came to Texas to direct the violin department at Kidd-Key College in Sherman. In 1911, he helped bring a moribund Dallas Symphony Orchestra back into existence and assumed the post of music director, a position he would hold until 1914; in 1913 he took a concurrent similar position with the Fort Worth Symphony Orchestra. In 1914 Venth was appointed Dean of Fine Arts at Texas Woman's College (now Texas Wesleyan University) in Fort Worth. Venth remained in Fort Worth until 1931 but served as concertmaster of the Dallas Symphony from 1927 to 1931. In 1931, he moved to San Antonio to become Dean of Fine Arts at Westmoreland College (which was renamed the University of San Antonio during Venth's tenure and is now known as Trinity University), where he taught violin, harmony, and theory.

Throughout his professional life Venth was active as a composer. He composed at least three operas (Pan, The Monk of Iona, Fair Betty [listed as Fairy Betty in one source]), four cantatas, two violin concertos, two string quartets, a piano trio, three violin sonatas, numerous songs, orchestral works, piano solo works, and pieces for violin and piano. Many of his compositions were premiered in New York and other important venues and were issued by major publishing houses, including Breitkopf & Härtel and Carl Fischer. Pan is described in Venth's Dallas Morning News obituary as "the first American opera to gain international recognition."

Venth died in San Antonio, Texas, at the age of 77. His autobiography, My Memories, was published posthumously, in 1939, by Alamo Printing Company of San Antonio.

== Sources ==
- Abraham, April. "Solo Piano Music by San Antonio Composers" (doctoral treatise), pp. 42–50. Austin TX: 1984.
- Baker's Biographical Dictionary of Musicians, Eighth Edition, ed. Nicolas Slonimsky. New York: Schirmer Books, 1992.
- "Dr. Carl Venth, 77, Composer, Dies At San Antonio." The Dallas Morning News, 30 January 1938.
- International Who's Who in Music and Musical Gazetteer, ed. César Saerchinger. New York: Current Literature Publishing Company, 1918.
