= Sidney Foster =

American pianist (1917–1977)

Sidney Foster (May 23, 1917 – February 7, 1977), born Sidney Earl Finkelstein, was an American virtuoso pianist and teacher. He studied with Isabelle Vengerova and David Saperton at the Curtis Institute of Music in Philadelphia, and in 1940 became the first winner of the Edgar M. Leventritt Award. He concertized over four decades in the United States and performed in Europe, the Soviet Union, Israel and Japan. He was Professor of Piano at Indiana University from 1952 to 1977. He was described as "a virtuoso and a great interpreter of great music," and affirmed as "everything the connoisseurs claim he is: an interesting, original pianist, the master of tonal shading and an artist."

== Biography ==
=== Early years ===
Sidney Foster was born in Florence, South Carolina, in 1917, the son of Louis Finkelstein and Anna Diamond. At age four, he began to play popular tunes on the piano that he heard on the radio. In 1925, he moved to Miami, Florida and had piano lessons with Earl Chester Smith, faculty member of the University of Miami. In 1927, while still living in Florida, his mother took him to New York City to play for pianist Josef Hofmann, then director of the Curtis Institute in Philadelphia. He was accepted, at age 10, the youngest person to have been admitted to that celebrated institution.

He was assigned to the class of David Saperton, Hofmann's assistant (and the son-in-law of pianist Leopold Godowsky). At the first lesson, when it became clear that the young boy lacked proficiency in reading music, Saperton demanded an explanation, given that Foster had played Beethoven's Pathetique Sonata for Josef Hofmann months before. Foster explained that he had learned the sonata by listening to a record a few times.

After working on his reading skills with a secondary teacher, Foster was soon assigned to Isabelle Vengerova, with whom he studied for two years. He then left Curtis for a few years, during which he studied with Arthur Newstead in New York, and for three years with Walter Goldstein in New Orleans, where his family had moved by that time.

When he returned to Curtis, in 1934, he studied with Saperton until his graduation in 1938. In October 1939 he married Bronja Singer, a fellow student of Saperton's. The couple had two sons, Lincoln and Justin, born in 1942 and 1945.

=== Performing career ===
In 1938, Foster won the MacDowell Competition, and in October 1940 his winning of the Edgar M. Leventritt Prize led to his debut with the New York Philharmonic Orchestra at Carnegie Hall under John Barbirolli. For his debut, Foster played Beethoven's C Minor Concerto, and composed his own first movement cadenza. His appearance was hailed by The New York Times with the headline "Ovation to Foster," declaring, "With all the enthusiasm of youth, Mr. Foster, whose approach to the keyboard was of the noble, heroic type, gave the concerto a reading in the grand manner."

A few months later, Foster made his New York recital debut in Carnegie Hall, with "pianism that was thrillingly alive and facile...taking rhythmic and dynamic liberties, sometimes very daring for a youthful artist, but which most often evidenced a remarkable feeling for striking effect.".

Embarking on a busy national concert schedule, Foster continued to appear on New York City stages—over a dozen times in the 1940s, including eight solo Carnegie Hall recitals and additional performances with the New York Philharmonic at Lewisohn Stadium and under the baton of Dimitri Mitropoulos.

In succeeding years, Foster performed with the major American orchestras, including the Chicago Symphony at Ravinia under William Steinberg, the Cincinnati Symphony, the Boston Symphony under Aaron Copland—performing the Boston premier of Bartok's Piano Concerto no. 3 (1965), Houston Symphony Orchestra, Minneapolis Symphony, Utah Symphony under Maurice Abravanel, Indianapolis Symphony under Fabian Sevitsky as well as Izler Solomon, Dallas Symphony under Jacques Singer, among many others.

In 1955, in the hours following a recital in Racine, Wisconsin, Foster suffered a significant heart attack, which required prolonged hospitalization and kept him from concert stages for over two years.

In 1959, he returned to Carnegie Hall in "One of the most remarkable concert returns of our times. This was princely playing indeed...One of America's best pianists.". "He is a virtuoso in the true meaning of the word. Under his fingers the piano sang again as it used to when the great masters of the past were at the piano." The New York Times called it, "An excellent recital. It is fine to have him back!"

Foster toured Japan in 1962, playing recitals, concerti with orchestra, and chamber music with violinist Toshiya Eto. ("Rarely has Tokyo heard such beautiful playing."). Also in the 1960s, he performed in London, Holland, Germany and Israel. In November 1964, he toured the Soviet Union, playing sixteen concerts—with three programs and four concerti—in twenty-two days. ("He is one of the most impressive pianists to visit Moscow this century.").

Foster's programming and performance of his 1970 New York recital was recognized as part of the "structure that is coming to be known as the Romantic Revival." (The program consisted of Hummel's rarely played La Bella Capricciosa, Chopin's F minor Ballade, Liszt Sonata, Scriabin's Sonata No. 9, Moszkowski's On the Guitar, Cracovienne Fantastique by Paderewski, Homann's Berceuse, and Delibes-Dohnanyi's Naila Waltz.) New York Times critic Harold C. Schonberg wrote that "Mr. Foster is a throwback. He not only likes the music beloved of a previous generation, but he also plays it with the charm and flexibility that the old-timers used to have. That means a singing tone, an ability to take liberties in phrase without distorting the line, and a steady rhythmic momentum."

Sidney Foster continued to concertize into the mid-1970s, his last performance a little more than a month before his untimely death, at age 59, on February 7, 1977.

In the 1940s, Foster had premiered Norman Dello Joio's First and Second Piano Sonatas as well as his Prelude: To a Young Musician. On a few occasions Foster would compose a small work for his New York audiences, using a nom de plume; for a January 1946 recital, however, he programmed a work under his own name.

In 1944, at the suggestion of his management to complement his solo career, Foster founded a flute, piano and cello trio with French flutist René Le Roy and Hungarian cellist Janos Scholz, for which Foster commissioned works of Dello Joio and of Bohuslav Martinu, which were premiered in New York City's Town Hall in 1944 and 1945, respectively. Foster also composed two trios for the ensemble, commandeering the name of a friend, Eudoro Silvera, as the pseudonymic composer for the first, but appending his own name to the second. Although the trio itself and the compositions were critical successes—with the Martinu becoming an enduring staple of the literature—the trio disbanded after two years.

=== Teaching ===
Foster combined a performing career with regular teaching. In 1949 he taught at Florida State University in Tallahassee, and in 1952 he was hired by Dean Wilfred C. Bain to teach at Indiana University, where he received the Frederich Bachman Lieber Award in 1975 and was named Distinguished Professor, "the ultimate professional rank given by Indiana University" in 1976.

For several years he was joined on the Indiana University faculty by his childhood friends—and Curtis Institute classmates—concert pianists Abbey Simon and Jorge Bolet. In 1972 the three gave solo recitals on successive weeks in Lincoln Center's Tully Hall to benefit the Indiana University Music School Scholarship Fund. The NY Times deemed the Series, "Three Pianists Who Teach.".

=== Later years ===
In 1962, Foster was diagnosed with Agnogenic Myeloid Metaplasia—also later called myelofibrosis with myeloid metaplasia—a disease of the bone marrow causing systemic disruption and enlarged spleen or liver, the prognosis of which at that time was death within an average of seven years. Despite the gradual toll it took—with weakness, discomfort, difficulty sleeping and increasing, but reasonably well disguised, frailty—Foster kept the diagnosis solely within his immediate family, continuing to concertize, performing his teaching duties at Indiana University, carrying a full load of students every semester, until his passing.

Foster died in Boston, at the New England Medical Center, on February 7, 1977, after an operation for the removal of his spleen. In its obituary, The New York Times called him "one of the major pianists of his generation."

== Recordings ==
His recorded legacy includes two discs for the Musical Heritage Society: one features two Mozart Concerti with the Vienna Chamber Orchestra under Helmuth Froschauer, and the other, Opus 36-38 Clementi Sonatinas. Foster's live April 9, 1965 performance of the Bartok 3rd Piano Concerto—noted by the Boston Herald for its "brilliance and control" —with the Boston Symphony under Aaron Copland, including the complete orchestral program, is published by St. Laurent Studio.

In 1993, the International Piano Archives at Maryland published a two-CD album, "Ovation to Sidney Foster," with several live performances from his recitals at Indiana University. David Dubal, referring to Foster's performances of Mendelssohn's Three Etudes, Opus 104, and Prokofiev's Third Sonata in this album, called them "essential recordings of American pianism".

In December 2018, a 7-CD set of live Sidney Foster recital and concerti performances, Rediscovering an American Master, was released by Marston Records.

== Discography ==
- ”Sidney Foster: Rediscovering an American Master,” Marston Records, 57001-2 (7CDs), 2018
- "Ovation to Sidney Foster," International Piano Archives at Maryland, University of Maryland, 1993, IPAM 1204A-1204B
- "Aaron Copland Conducts," Sidney Foster Performs Bartok Piano Concerto #3, St Laurent Studio YSL T-299, Norbeck, Peters & Ford, Item C-1386
- Muzio Clementi, Sonatinas Op. 36, 37 & 38, Musical Heritage Society, MHS 992/993
- Wolfgang A. Mozart, Piano Concertos Nº8 in C Major, K246 and Nº26 in D Major, K537 Musical Heritage Society, MHS 949
