= William Harms =

American classical pianist

William Harms (October 28, 1903 – January 6, 1983) was an American classical pianist.

Harms studied piano as a high school student at the Ottawa University Academy with Norma Utt and Lucy Forbes. He then graduated to Molly Margolies in Kansas City at the Horner Institute for Fine Arts. Margolies was a former student and assistant of Rudolph Ganz. In 1925, Harms was heard by Alexander Brailowsky, who prophesied "a future on the concert stage" for the young pianist. Harms followed Margolies to New York City in spring of 1926, working intensively with her to prepare for an audition with Josef Hofmann.

Hofmann heard Harms in 1926 and accepted him as a scholarship student at Curtis. Although Harms initially wanted to study with Benno Moiseiwitsch, the Curtis Dean suggested that he work instead with the Liszt pupil Moriz Rosenthal, with whom he worked for two years. He later joined Hofmann's studio. In 1931, he began teaching at Curtis himself, first as a secondary piano instructor, and then later as an assistant to Hofmann's replacement, Rudolf Serkin. From 1937 to 1977, he taught at Manhattanville College in Purchase, NY.

Harms performed the first movement of the Rubinstein D Minor Concerto with the Curtis Symphony and Fritz Reiner in 1933 on a nationwide radio broadcast. He made his debut with the New York Philharmonic in 1936, performing the Liszt Concerto no. 1 in E-flat Major conducted by José Iturbi. He recorded a single commercial disc, the complete Préludes I of Claude Debussy.
