= David Saperton =

American pianist (1889–1970)

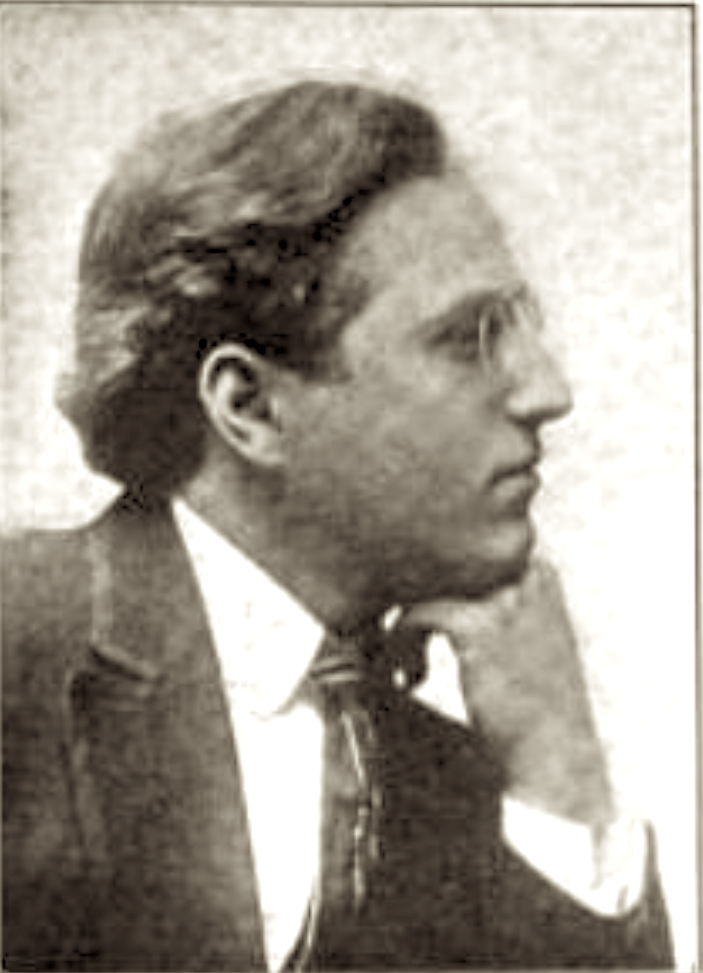
Saperton in 1915

David Saperton (October 29, 1889 – July 5, 1970) was an American pianist known for being the first pianist to play the entire original compositions as well as the complete transcriptions of his father-in-law, Leopold Godowsky. He also recorded a number of Godowsky's Studies on Chopin's Études as well as other pieces. His students at the Curtis Institute of Music and later include Jacques Abram, Jeanne Behrend, Jorge Bolet, Shura Cherkassky, Sidney Foster, Julius Katchen, Seymour Lipkin, William Masselos, John Simms, Abbey Simon, Eleanor Sokoloff, Dorothy Wanderman, Alan Weiss, and Frances Ziffer. As a pianist he is regarded as a great dramatist, a sensitive poet, and superb colorist.

== Life ==
Saperton was born David Sapirstein in Pittsburgh, Pennsylvania, on October 29, 1889. He began the study of piano at the age of six, under the guidance of his grandfather, an internationally-known tenor and musician. Saperton's father, a graduate physician of the University of Pittsburgh, was also a basso of repute. Leopold Godowsky, later his father-in law, heard David as a child prodigy of eight. His principal teacher was German pianist and editor August Spanuth, who himself was a pupil of Carl Heymann and Joachim Raff at the Hoch Conservatory in Frankfurt. Spanuth was known as a music critic in New York City and later took a professorship at the Berlin Stern Conservatory. Saperton later appeared in a joint concert with Geraldine Farrar in Berlin, 1908. In 1909, he performed a large repertoire in 180 cities throughout Europe. Saperton also attended masterclasses of Ferruccio Busoni and may have had some lessons with Rafael Joseffy, himself a disciple of Franz Liszt.

His debut was at New York's Metropolitan Opera House where he played Chopin's Concerto in E minor at the age of fifteen. He played a solo recital to critical acclaim a year later at Mendelssohn Hall. In 1912, he returned to New York where he played very successful recitals but failed to attract an impresario. In 1915 he played a series of six recitals at Aeolian Hall including major works by Szymanowski, Liszt, Brahms, Beethoven, Schumann, Chopin and others. After appearing in all major American cities on a tour in 1917–1918, he withdrew into private life.

Saperton married Godowsky's daughter, Vanita, sister of silent movie star Dagmar Godowsky, in 1924 and began to immerse himself in the study of his father-in-law's difficult piano works, including all the transcriptions. Godowsky also introduced Saperton to Josef Hofman and the Curtis Institute where he taught a number of famous pianists before he was fired. He shifted the emphasis of his career from performing to teaching and composition, remaining essentially a private teacher in New York where he died on July 5, 1970. Pianist Andrew Kraus who studied with Saperton in the last months of his life, writes: "Experiencing his playing in the intimacy of his studio was, for me, an initiation into a way of playing the piano that had been lost as well as an introduction to a genre of wonderfully beautiful and interesting music that had fallen out of fashion".

== Recordings ==
In 1940, Saperton recorded an album of Godowsky works for RCA Victor. A subsequent recording of ten Chopin-Godowsky studies was never released because RCA contributed the brass masters to be melted down for shell casings to be used in World War II. Saperton's only extant recording of these studies, issued on the poorly distributed Command Performance label, stem from 1952, when his pianistic prowess was beginning to decline. Together with the complete Chopin Etudes and other Godowsky works this recording has been reissued by Video Artists International.

== Teaching ==
Saperton's father-in-law Leopold Godowsky introduced him to Josef Hofmann, the director of the Curtis Institute of Music in Philadelphia, who hired him as an assistant and as a member of the faculty in 1924. He taught many famous pianists such as Jacques Abram, Jorge Bolet, Shura Cherkassky, Sidney Foster, Julius Katchen, Eleanor Sokoloff, Seymour Lipkin, John Simms, Abbey Simon, and Alan Weiss. English critic Bryce Morrison commented on Saperton's perfectionism as a teacher: "His insistence on nothing less than keyboard perfection from his most gifted student [Bolet] was hectoring and obsessive […] Stung by Saperton's constant criticism and sarcasm Bolet sought refuge in occasional lessons with Godowsky himself, Rosenthal and Hoffmann."

When Hofmann had a falling out with Mary Louise Curtis Bok (later Zimbalist) (the founder and president of the Curtis Institute), and was dismissed as director, Saperton was dismissed along with him.

== In popular culture ==
Recordings by Saperton fill in for some of the piano sequences with William Prince's character in the 1947 Hollywood movie Carnegie Hall.
