= Herbert Menges =

English composer and conductor

Herbert Menges OBE (27 August 1902 – 20 February 1972) was an English conductor and composer, who wrote incidental music to all of Shakespeare's plays.

== Life and career ==
Siegfried Frederick Herbert Menges was born in Hove on 27 August 1902. His father was German and his mother British. His elder sister was the violinist Isolde Menges. Herbert appeared in public as a violinist at the age of four. He later abandoned the violin for the piano, which he studied with Mathilde Verne and Arthur De Greef. He later studied composition at the Royal College of Music under Gustav Holst and Ralph Vaughan Williams.

Menges's mother Kate founded the Brighton Symphony Players in 1925 and the first concert was given in the Hove Town Hall on 18 May 1925, conducted by Herbert Menges. After some years the Players evolved into the Brighton Philharmonic Society, a forerunner of the Southern Philharmonic Orchestra, a professional group based in Brighton from 1945 which also gave regular concerts in Portsmouth and Hastings. Menges was a powerful advocate of the regional professional orchestras. He remained the orchestra's musical director for the remaining 47 years of his life, during which time it became the Brighton Philharmonic Orchestra in 1958, and conducted the orchestra 326 times. He conducted the premieres of a number of works by contemporary English composers.

In 1931 he became musical director of the Old Vic Theatre, in which capacity he wrote (or arranged from composers such as Henry Purcell) incidental music for all the plays of William Shakespeare, and numerous plays by other writers. Notable among these was his music for a 1949 production of Love's Labour's Lost. He was associated with the productions of John Gielgud from 1933 onwards. His assistant there for three years was John Cook. He remained with the Old Vic until 1950. From 1941 to 1944, alongside Lawrance Collingwood he conducted performances in London and around Britain for operas with the Sadler's Wells Theatre Orchestra, before returning to the Old Vic company when it moved to the New Theatre. He toured with Laurence Olivier and Ralph Richardson to Paris, Germany, the Low countries and New York, where he also conducted the CBS Symphony Orchestra.

He also became musical director of the Royalty Theatre in London. In 1931 he founded the London Rehearsal Orchestra, whose purpose was to help young musicians learn difficult pieces.

In 1951 he wrote the music for the Laurence Olivier-Vivien Leigh Broadway production of Shakespeare's Antony and Cleopatra. That same year, Malcolm Arnold dedicated his A Sussex Overture, Op. 31, to Herbert Menges and the Brighton Philharmonic Society.

He considered that he had a strong affinity with Bach and conducted the Viennese classics and composers such as Verdi and Tchaikovsky with restraint, while his Brahms and Dvořák are warmer in his interpretations. His rehearsal and conducting technique were commended for their economy and he would often forego the baton in more expressive passages. A later critic, discussing his recordings, praised the rhythmic acuity, superb internal balance in the orchestra and the precision of attack he achieved, comparing his approach with Paul Paray and Pierre Monteux.

He had conducted engagements with the Royal Philharmonic Orchestra, the Liverpool Philharmonic Orchestra, and the BBC Symphony Orchestra. He became Director of Music at the Chichester Festival Theatre in 1962.

Herbert Menges was appointed an Officer of the Order of the British Empire in 1963. He died on 20 February 1972, in London, aged 69. His name now appears as a tribute on some Brighton and Hove buses.

Many of his letters and scores are held at McMaster University Library, Hamilton, Ontario, Canada.

He was married in 1935 to Evelyn Stiebel and had three children, Nicholas, Christopher (an Academy Award-winning cinematographer) and Susannah.

== Recordings ==
Herbert Menges made a number of recordings, almost all of which were of concertante works:

- Ludwig van Beethoven: Piano Concertos No. 1-5, Philharmonia Orchestra, Solomon
- Johannes Brahms, Violin Concerto in D, London Symphony Orchestra, Joseph Szigeti
- Benjamin Britten, Piano Concerto, Jacques Abram, Philharmonia Orchestra, recorded Abbey Rd, 25 January 1956
- Edvard Grieg, Piano Concerto in A minor, Moura Lympany
- Grieg: Piano Concerto in A minor, Philharmonia Orchestra, Solomon
- Wolfgang Amadeus Mozart: Piano Concertos Nos. 23 and 24, Philharmonia Orchestra, Solomon
- Sergei Prokofiev, Piano Concerto No. 2 in G minor, Philharmonia Orchestra, Shura Cherkassky
- Prokofiev, Violin Concerto No. 1, London Symphony Orchestra, Joseph Szigeti
- Sergei Rachmaninoff, Rhapsody on a Theme of Paganini, Shura Cherkassky
- Alan Rawsthorne, Piano Concerto No. 1, Philharmonia Orchestra, Moura Lympany
- Edmund Rubbra, Piano Concerto in G, Op. 55, Philharmonia Orchestra, Jacques Abram
- Robert Schumann: Piano Concerto in A minor, Philharmonia Orchestra, Solomon
- Dmitri Shostakovich, Piano Concerto No. 1 (for piano, trumpet and strings), Philharmonia Orchestra, Shura Cherkassky
- Pyotr Ilyich Tchaikovsky: Piano Concerto No. 1 in B♭ minor, London Symphony Orchestra, Byron Janis
- Tchaikovsky: Variations on a Rococo Theme, Philharmonia Orchestra, Paul Tortelier
- Ralph Vaughan Williams: The Wasps, overture, London Symphony Orchestra
- Peter Warlock, Capriol Suite, Philharmonia Orchestra (His Master's Voice – 7EP 7063)
- Holst: St Paul's Suite, Philharmonia Orchestra (His Master's Voice – 7EP 7054)
- Herbert Menges: Suite of incidental Music to the play 'Richard of Bordeaux' (1932) performed by instrumental septet conducted by Menges with Gwen Ffrangcon-Davies (soprano) Decca K 727 (Side 1 only).
