= Abbey Simon =

American musician

- Born: January 8, 1920; New York City, U.S.
- Origin: Curtis Institute of Music
- Died: December 18, 2019 (aged 99) Geneva, Switzerland
- Genres: Classical
- Instrument: Piano
- Years active: 1940–2019
- Website: http://www.abbeysimon.com/

Abbey Henry Simon (January 8, 1920 – December 18, 2019) was an American concert pianist, teacher, and recording artist. He was a protégé of Josef Hofmann at the Curtis Institute of Music and a winner of the Naumburg International Piano Competition in 1940. He was called a "supervirtuoso" by The New York Times.

== Education ==
Simon began lessons with David Saperton at the age of five. At the age of eight, Simon was accepted by Josef Hofmann as a scholarship student at the Curtis Institute of Music in Philadelphia, where his classmates included Jorge Bolet and Sidney Foster. Simon also took lessons from Leopold Godowsky, Dora Zaslavsky, and Harold Bauer. Shortly after graduation, he debuted at the Town Hall and Carnegie Hall in New York City. He won the Naumburg International Piano Competition in 1940.

== Career ==
Simon performed to critical acclaim. The critic Harold C. Schonberg of the New York Times once hailed Simon as a "supervirtuoso". Boston Globe critic Richard Dyer wrote, "Simon's recital offered more than a glimpse into the fabled golden age of piano playing...His virtuosity is marked not only by speed, power, lightness and accuracy but also by intricate interplay of voices and lambent colors."

Simon toured in Europe, the Middle East, and the Pacific. He appeared with the New York Philharmonic, Boston Symphony, Chicago Symphony, Royal Concertgebouw Orchestra, London Symphony Orchestra, Houston Symphony, and the Trenton Symphony Orchestra, among many others.

Simon gave master classes at the Royal Academy of Music in London, Royal Conservatory of The Hague, and the Geneva Conservatory. From 1960 to 1974, he was a faculty member at Indiana University, where he taught alongside his Curtis classmates Bolet and Foster. He also served on the faculties of the Manhattan School of Music, Hunter College, the Moores School of Music in Houston, and the Juilliard School of Music in New York City. His students include pianists Josef Verba, Eliza Garth, Frederic Chiu, Karen Shaw, John Kamitsuka, Erika Nickrenz, Richard Dowling, Elyane Laussade, Adrienne Park, Roger Wright, Garnet Ungar, Hsia-Jung Chang, Shelly Berg, Andrew Cooperstock, Daniel Glover, David Korevaar, Nancy Weems, David Westfall, Terence Yung, and Martha Argerich.

In addition to performing, teaching, and recording as a musical artist, Abbey Simon served as a jury member of the Van Cliburn International Piano Competition, the Geneva International Music Competition, the Leeds International Piano Competition, the Clara Haskil International Piano Competition, the Sydney International Piano Competition, and the South Africa International Piano Competition.

Simon lived in Geneva, Switzerland. He maintained a home in Houston, Texas, where he was, from 1977 until his retirement in April 2019, Cullen Distinguished Professor of Music in the Moores School of Music in the University of Houston.

Simon died in Geneva on December 18, 2019, a few weeks prior to his 100th birthday.

== Awards and honors ==
- Walter Naumburg Prize, (1940)
- National Orchestral Award
- Federation of Music Prize
- Harriet Cohen Medal
- Elizabeth Sprague Coolidge Medal
- Ford Foundation Award
- Distinguished Teacher Award at the Moores School of Music

== Discography ==
Abbey Simon recorded extensively on the VOX, Philips, and His Master's Voice labels. His discography includes the complete works of Frédéric Chopin and Maurice Ravel, major works of Johannes Brahms and Robert Schumann, and all of the piano concerti of Sergei Rachmaninoff with Leonard Slatkin and the St. Louis Symphony Orchestra. Classics Today's Jed Distler called Simon's Ravel set a reference recording, and David Hurwitz included it in his The Greatest Recordings EVER! series.

- Albeniz-Godowsky:
  - Triana from "Iberia" (DANACORD DACOCD 379)
- Beethoven:
  - Quintet for piano and winds (VOX-Turnabout TVC 37004)
- Brahms:
  - Concerto No. 1 in D-minor (Prize Winning Recording of a live performance, Buenos-Aires, dir. Juan-Jose Castro)
  - Variations on a theme by Paganini, Op. 35 (VOX VU 9004)
  - Variations and Fugue on a Theme by Handel, Op. 24 & Variations on a theme by Paganini (PHILIPS A 00195 L)
  - Three pieces for piano solo (His Master's Voice)
  - F minor Sonata, Op. 5 (His Master's Voice)
  - Intermezzi, Capriccios, Fantasies and Rhapsodies (PHILIPS)
- Chopin:
  - The Four Scherzi (VOX VU 9030)
  - The Four Ballades, Impromptus, and Berceuse (VOX VU 9031)
  - The Sonatas and Barcarolle (VOX VU 9032)
  - Etudes, Op.10 & 25 (VOX VU 9033)
  - The Complete Waltzes, Fantasie & Variations Brillantes (VOX VU 9034)
  - Nocturnes (complete) (VOX CDX 5146)
  - Preludes (VOX)
  - The Piano Concertos (His Master's Voice, EMI D 13175Z) (Royal Philharmonic Orchestra, dir. Sir Eugene Goossens)
  - The Complete Orchestral Works (VOX 5002) (Hamburg Symphony Orchestra, dir. Heribert Beissel)
- Dohnanyi:
  - Variations on a Nursery Song (UNESCO classics DCL707202)
- Franck:
  - Prélude, Chorale and Fugue (His Master's Voice)
- Grieg:
  - Piano Concerto in A minor, Op. 16 (Philips)
- Liszt:
  - Six Grandes Etudes de Paganini (VOX VU 9004)
  - Etude in D-flat major (Un Sospiro) (His Master's Voice)
- Mendelssohn:
  - 17 Variations Sérieuses (VOX TVS 34460)
- Rachmaninoff:
  - The Complete Works for Piano & Orchestra (VOX CDX 5008) (St. Louis Symphony Orchestra, dir. Leonard Slatkin)
  - Rachmaninoff Piano Concerto No 3 in D minor, Op. 30 (To be released) (Japan Philharm. Orchestra, dir. Akeo Watanabe)
- Ravel:
  - Piano Concerto in G (VOX CDX 5031)
  - Piano Concerto in D for the Left Hand (VOX CDX 5032) (Orchestre de Radio-Luxembourg, Dir. Louis de Froment)
  - Complete Works for Piano Solo (VOX CDX 5012)
- Saint-Saëns:
  - Le Carnaval des Animaux (EMI Classics DCL 707202) (With Hephzibah Menuhin and the Philharmonia Orchestra, dir. Efrem Kurz)
- Schumann:
  - Variations on the name ABEGG, Kreisleriana, Arabesque, Kinderscenen (DANTE PSG 9649)
  - Carnaval, Op. 9 & Fantasy in C, Op. 17 (VOX ACD 8192)
- Transcriptions:
  - by Liszt, Rachmaninoff, Godowsky, Chasins (VOX 8204)
