= Malcolm Frager =

American classical pianist (1935–1991)

Malcolm Frager (January 15, 1935 – June 20, 1991) was an American piano virtuoso and recording artist.

== Education ==
Frager was born in St. Louis, Missouri, and studied with Carl Friedberg in New York City from 1949 until Friedberg's death in 1955. In 1957 he graduated magna cum laude and Phi Beta Kappa from Columbia University with a major in Russian.

== Competitions and debut ==
He won the Piano Competition in Geneva (1955), the Michaels Memorial Award in Chicago (1956), the Leventritt Competition in New York City (1959), and the Queen Elisabeth Music Competition in Brussels (1960).

== Performances and recordings ==
He made his Carnegie Hall debut in November 1960, performing Prokofiev's Piano Sonata No. 6.

His Grammy-nominated debut recording with RCA Victor Red Seal was Prokofiev's Piano Concerto No. 2 in G minor, Op. 16 and Haydn's Sonata No. 35 in E-flat.

Apart from the Prokofiev Piano Concerto No. 2, Frager and Ronald Turini, who had won second prize in the 1960 Queen Elizabeth competition, did not make any concerto recordings under their RCA contracts, which were reserved for Van Cliburn following his triumph in the Moscow Competition against a field of regional pianists.

Some important live performances from Frager survive in off-the-air transcripts, for example the 1972 Beethoven Piano Concerto No. 4 with the Boston Symphony Orchestra conducted by Michael Tilson Thomas. and the 1972 performance of Mozart Piano Concerto No. 23 with the Cleveland Orchestra conducted by Aldo Ceccato. RCA did not make any recordings of Frager performing the piano concertos of Mozart or Beethoven.

He recorded solo piano music by Mozart, Haydn, Chopin, Schumann, Beethoven, Brahms and Prokofiev. For example Telarc Records "Malcolm Frager Plays Chopin" CD-80040 published 1979 originally on digital audiophile LP.

Frager regularly programmed the two piano concertos and numerous solo works by Carl Maria von Weber, as well as the keyboard compositions of C. P. E. Bach.

He completed acclaimed musical tours of Southern Africa in 1976 and 1978.

Frager performed Mozart Piano Concerto No. 19 with Nikolaus Harnoncourt and the Concertgebouw Orchestra in 1983.

== Legacy ==
Frager's personal library is now housed at the Sibley Library Special Collections at the Eastman School of Music in Rochester, New York. His discovery of manuscripts includes a version of the Fantasie in A minor that later became the first movement of the Piano Concerto in A minor by Schumann. He premiered this with the Boston Symphony Orchestra under Erich Leinsdorf at the Tanglewood Festival in August 1968. He also unearthed and performed the original version of Tchaikovsky's Piano Concerto No. 1, which Nikolai Rubinstein had criticised so unmercifully as to cause the composer to withdraw the intended dedication to him. In 1978 Frager visited the Jagiellonian Library in Kraków, Poland where he persuaded librarians to make available a cache of more than one thousand original manuscripts missing (and believed lost) since World War II. The collection included pieces by Bach, Beethoven, Schumann and Mozart.

In 1987 Frager received the Golden Mozart Pin from the International Mozart Foundation in Salzburg.

== Personal ==
Frager was brought up in a Jewish family that had converted to Christian Science. He died in Pittsfield, Massachusetts on June 20, 1991. His family declined to state the cause of death, but he was reported to have been ill for about a year.
