= Dorothy Wanderman =

American composer and pianist

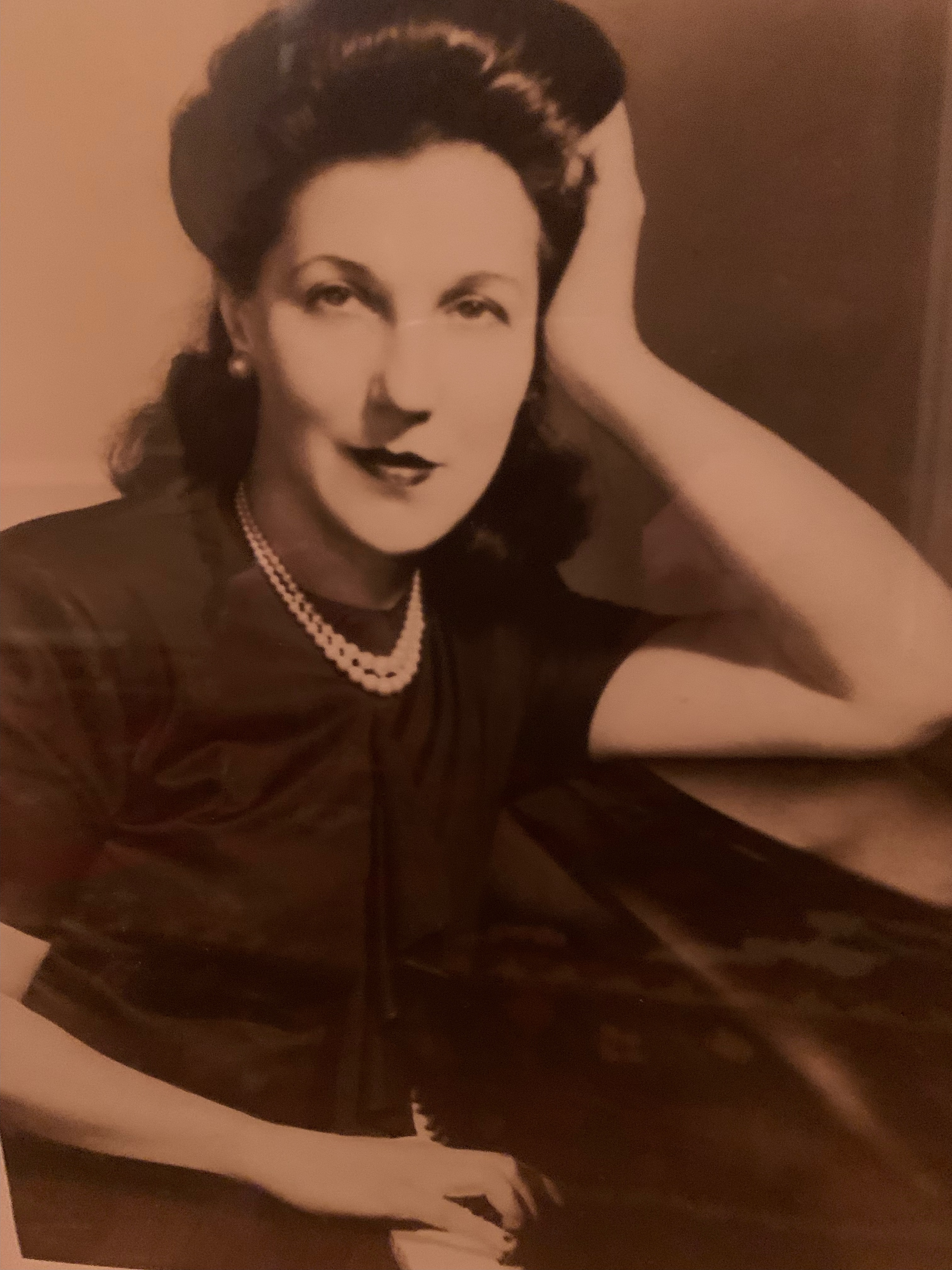
Dorothy Wanderman

Dorothy Cherurg Wanderman (October 20, 1897 – July 1988) was an American composer and pianist who was born in New York. She studied music with Isidor Philipp and David Saperton. She married Dr. Seymour Wanderman and they had two daughters, Helene and Carol.

Wanderman socialized with composer Leopold Godowksy, who was the father-in-law of her teacher Saperton. Godowsky dedicated his composition Waltz Poem No. 2 to her. Wanderman was a member of the American Society of Composers, Authors and Publishers (ASCAP). Her music was published by the Boston Music Company, and includes the following works for piano:

- In a French Cafe
- In a Vietnamese Garden
- Playful Mouse
- Playtime March
- Swiss Alpine Waltz
