= Jorge Bolet =

Cuban-born American pianist and conductor (1914–1990)

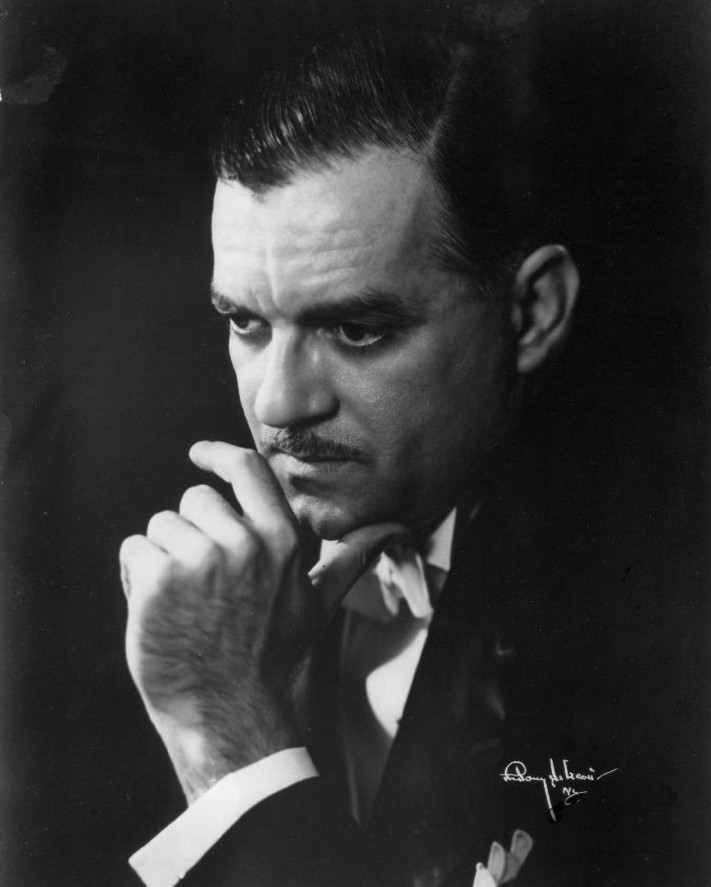
- Bolet in 1975
- Born: November 15, 1914; Havana, Cuba
- Died: October 16, 1990 (aged 75); Mountain View, California, United States
- Occupation: Pianist

Jorge Bolet (November 15, 1914 – October 16, 1990) was a Cuban-born American concert pianist, conductor and teacher. Among his teachers were Leopold Godowsky, and Moriz Rosenthal – the latter a renowned pupil of Franz Liszt.

== Life ==
Bolet was born in Havana and studied at the Curtis Institute of Music in Philadelphia, where he taught from 1939 to 1942. His teachers included Leopold Godowsky, Josef Hofmann, David Saperton, Moriz Rosenthal and Fritz Reiner.

In 1937, he won the Naumburg Competition and gave his debut recital. In 1942, Bolet joined the US Army. He was sent to Japan as part of the Army of Occupation. While there, he conducted the Japanese premiere of The Mikado. He made his first recordings for the Boston label which published recital recordings in 1952. He recorded the Second Piano Concerto of Sergei Prokofiev with the Cincinnati Symphony Orchestra on the Remington label. He also recorded the Four Scherzos of Frédéric Chopin on Remington. These recordings were made in the fall of 1953.

Bolet provided the piano soundtrack for the 1960 biopic Song Without End, which starred Dirk Bogarde as the legendary 19th-century piano virtuoso Franz Liszt. (The film won the Academy Award for Best Music score.) However, Bolet's playing was condemned by American music critics for decades as being too focused on romantic virtuosity, so his recordings in the 1960s were confined to fairly small and hard-to-find labels. Only in 1974 did he come to national prominence, with a stupendous recital in that year at Carnegie Hall, which sealed his reputation.

From 1968 to 1977, Bolet was Professor of Music (piano) at Indiana University, where he taught alongside his childhood friends Abbey Simon and Sidney Foster. In 1977, Bolet became Head of Piano at the Curtis Institute of Music, succeeding Rudolf Serkin, but he resigned from this post to concentrate on his performing career.

In 1984, the A&E Network broadcast a series of three programs, entitled Bolet Meets Rachmaninoff, in which the pianist was shown giving masterclasses on the subject of Sergei Rachmaninoff's Piano Concerto No. 3. These masterclasses were followed on the series by a complete performance of Bolet playing the concerto.

The Decca/London record company put him under contract in 1978, giving the 64-year-old Bolet his first systematic exposure to life at a major international label. Recordings of key sections of his repertoire were made from 1978 up to his death, but there are also tapes of many live concerts from this time, which were never commercially released but can be found in archives, principally the International Piano Archives at Maryland. Such performances include a specialty of his, Leopold Godowsky's "Concert Paraphrase on Themes from Johann Strauss's Die Fledermaus", which he studied with Godowsky during his student years.

Bolet's health began to decline in 1988 and, in 1989, he underwent a brain operation from which he never fully recovered. He died from heart failure in October 1990, at his home in Mountain View, California.

== Recordings ==
External audio
- You may hear Jorge Bolet with Julius Rudel and the Stadium Symphony Orchestra of New York at Lewisohn Stadium in Rachmaninoff's Piano Concerto No. 3 in D minor, Op. 30 in 1957; Here on wnyc.org

Bolet is particularly well remembered for his performances and recordings of large-scale Romantic music, particularly works by Franz Liszt, César Franck, and Frédéric Chopin. He also specialised in piano transcriptions and unusual repertoire, including the fiendishly difficult works of Godowsky, many of which Bolet had studied with the composer himself. In an interview given to Elyse Mach (Great Contemporary Pianists Speak for Themselves, Dover Books on Music), Bolet extensively mentioned an obscure piece by Joseph Marx which was, according to Bolet's own words, his favorite among virtuoso concertos because of the enormous show of strength required from the soloist. His stage manner was one of full concentration to the performance, characterised by minimal body movement.

In 2017–2018, the Audite label issued a series of CDs with broadcast recordings by Bolet from RIAS-Berlin, previously unreleased, mainly from the 1970s. Most of the repertory duplicates his commercial recordings, but the performances exhibit the extra stimulation of an audience.

- Bach, J.S., PIANO VIRTUOSOS—CZIFFRA, MOISEIWITSCH, & BOLET, Georges Cziffra, Benno Moiseiwitsch, & Jorge Bolet, Philharmonia Orchestra, Charles Groves, Medici Arts 1333 DVD
- Chopin, Four Ballades, Opp. 23, 38, 47, 52; Barcarolle Op. 60; Fantaisie Op. 49. London 417 651–2. [Recorded in Walthamstow Assembly Hall, 9/1986.]
- Chopin, 24 Preludes Op. 28; Ballade No. 2 in F major Op. 38; Ballade No. 4 in F minor Op. 52; Fantasie in F minor Op. 49. Eloquence 458 172-2 CD. [Ballades and Fantasie the same as above; Preludes recorded in 6/1987. Also issued on DECCA Eclipse.]
- Chopin, 24 Preludes Op. 28; Nocturnes Op. 27 Nos. 1&2, Op. 55 No. 1 and Op. 62 No. 2. London 421 363–2. [Recorded in St Barnabas' Church, London, 6/1987; piano: Baldwin].
- Chopin, Piano Concertors Nos. 1 and 2. Orchestre Symphonique de Montreal, Charles Dutoit. London 425 859–2. [Recorded in St Eustache, Montreal, 5/1989.]
- Chopin, Jorge Bolet In Concert Vol 1 - Chopin Andante Spianato e Grande Polonaise Op. 22; Barcarolle Op. 60; Impromptus 1, 2, & 4; Four Scherzos; Polonaises Op. 26; Nocturnes Op. 9 No. 3, Op. 15 No. 2, Op. 27 No. 2, & Op. 55 No. 1; Sonata No. 3 in B minor Op. 58; Chant Polonaise Op. 74 No. 12 "My Joys" (arr. Liszt); Waltz No. 14 in E minor Op. Posth., Jorge Bolet, Marston 52035-2 CD
- Debussy, Claude, Preludes Books 1 & 2 (selections), Jorge Bolet, Decca 425 518 2 CD
- Grieg, Edvard, Piano Concerto in A minor Op. 16, Jorge Bolet, Berlin Radio Symphony Orchestra, Riccardo Chailly, Decca 417 112 2 CD [Recorded in May 1985]
- Liszt, Études D’Exécution Transcendante, Ensayo 9711 CD. [Recorded in Barcelona, 1970.]
- Liszt, Bolet reDiscovered, RCA Red Seal: Liebestraum No. 3; Gnomenreigen; Un Sospiro; Funerailles; La Campanella; Waldesrauschen; Grand Galop chromatique; Rhapsodie Espagnole; Tannhäuser Overture. [Recorded in RCA Studio A, 1972–73; all pieces but the last two later re-recorded for DECCA.]
- Liszt, GREAT PIANISTS OF THE 20TH CENTURY VOLUME 11: JORGE BOLET II, Mephisto Waltz No. 1; Venezia e Napoli; Funérailles; Liebestraum No. 3; La Leggierezza; La Campanella; Sonetto 104 del Petrarca; Harmonies du soir; Gnomenreignen; Au bord d'une source; Consolation No. 3; Hungarian Rhapsody No. 12; Ricordanza; Réminiscences de Norma (Live), Jorge Bolet, Philips 456 814-2 CD [Recorded in 1978-88 for DECCA]
- Liszt, Paraphrases, Ensayo CD-9742 [Recorded in 1969]. Schubert, Die Forelle and Ständchen von Shakespeare; Chopin, Meine Freuden and Mädchens Wunsch; Schumann, Widmung and Frühlingsnacht; Liszt, Liebestraum No. 3; Donizetti, Reminiscences de Lucia di Lammermoor [see Great Pianists, Vol. 10]; Wagner, Spinner-Lied from Der fliegended Holländer; Verdi, Rigoletto Paraphrase.
- Liszt, Piano Works Vol. 1, Decca 410 257-2 CD: Hungarian Rhapsody No. 12, Liebestraum No. 3; Mephisto Waltz No. 1; Funerailles; Rigoletto - Concert Paraphrase; La Campanella. [Recorded in Kingsway Hall, London, 2&9/1982; piano: Bechstein].
- Liszt, Piano Works Vol. 2, Decca 410 575-2 CD: Schubert Song Transcriptions: Die Forelle; Der Müller und der Bach; Wohin?; Lebe wohl!; Das Wandern; Der Lindenbaum; Horch, horch, die Lerch; Auf dem Wasser zu singen; Die Post; Aufenthalt; Lob der Tränen; Erlkönig. [Recorded in Kingsway Hall, London, 11/1981; piano: Baldwin].
- Liszt, Piano Works Vol. 3, Decca 410 115-2 CD: Sonata in B minor; Valse Impromptu; Liebesträume Nos. 1–3; Grand galop chromatique. [Recorded in Kingsway Hall, London, 9/1982; piano: Bechstein].
- Liszt, Piano Works Vol. 4, Decca 410 162-2 CD: Annees de Pelerinage: Deuxieme Annee: Italie (complete, 7 pieces: Sposalizio, Il Penseroso, Canzonetta del Salvator Rosa, Sonetti 47, 104, 123 del Petrarca, Dante Sonata). [Recorded in Kingsway Hall, London, 9&12/1982; piano: Bechstein].
- Liszt, Piano Works Vol. 5, Decca 410 160-2 CD: Annees de Pelerinage: Premiere Annee: Suisse (complete, 9 pieces: Chapelle de Guillaume Tell, Au lac de Wallenstadt, Pastorale, Orage, Vallee d'Obermann, Eglogue, Le mal du pays, Le cloches de Geneve). [Recorded in Kingsway Hall, London, 3/1983; piano: Bechstein].
- Liszt, Piano Works Vol. 6, Decca 410 803-2 CD: Venezia e Napoli (3 pieces: Gondoliera, Canzone, Tarantella); Les jeux d'eau a la Villa d'Este; Benediction de Dieu dans la solitude; Ballade No. 2. [Recorded in Kingsway Hall, London, 10/1983; piano: Bechstein].
- Liszt, Piano Works Vol. VII, London 414 601-2 CD: Transcendental Studies, S. 161 (complete): Preludio; Molto vivace; Paysage; Mazeppa; Feux follets; Vision; Eroica; Wilde Jagd; Ricordanza; Allegro agitato molto; Harmonies du Soir; Chasse-neige. [Recorded in St Barnabas' Church, London, 3/1985; piano: Bechstein].
- Liszt, Concert Studies, S144 and S145; Consolations S172 [all cycles complete, 11 pieces altogether]; Reminiscences de Don Juan, S418. DECCA 417 523-2 CD. [Recorded in Kingsway Hall, London, 12/1978; except for the Consolations: recorded in St Barnabas' Church, London, 3/1985.]
- Liszt, Totentanz S126; Malediction S121; Hungarian Fantasy S123. London Symphony, Ivan Fischer. DECCA 417 079-2 CD. [Recorded in Walthamstow Assembly Hall, London, 3/1984; piano: Bechstein.]
- Liszt, Piano Works, DECCA 467 801-2 9CD. London Symphony Orchestra, London Philharmonic Orchestra, Iván Fischer, Georg Solti. All nine Liszt CDs from above plus Liszt's orchestration of Schubert's Wanderer Fantasie (with LPO and Solti).
- Liszt, Favourite Piano Works, Double DECCA 444 851-2 CD. Fine selection from the DECCA years. TT 139,51 minutes. Includes the Sonata in B minor, Reminiscences de Don Juan, Erlkönig, and many others.
- Liszt, Various works, Jorge Bolet RCA 63748-2 CD
- Rachmaninoff, Piano Concerto No. 3 in D minor Op. 30 [Recorded Live, 1969; Indiana University Symphony Orchestra]; Liszt, Die Forelle (Schubert); Des mädchens Wunsch (Chopin); Widmung (Schumann); Réminiscences de Lucia di Lammermoor (Donizetti); Spinnelied aus Der fliegende Holländer (Wagner); Rigoletto Paraphrase (Verdi) [Recorded in studio, 1969]. Palexa 0503 CD. Conductor not stated on the CD.
- Rachmaninoff, Piano Concerto No. 2 in C minor Op. 18, Orchestre Symphonique de Montréal, Charles Dutoit, Decca 421 181-2, recorded in St-Eustache (Quebec) Canada, May 1987.
- Rachmaninoff, Piano Concerto No. 3 in D minor Op. 30. London Symphony, Ivan Fischer. London 414 671–2. [Recorded in Kingsway Hall, London, 9/1982; piano: Bechstein.]
- Rachmaninoff, Variations on a Theme of Chopin Op. 22; Preludes Op. 3 No. 2, Op. 23 Nos. 5 and 10, Op. 32 Nos. 7 and 12; Melodie Op. 3 No. 3; Liebesleid and Liebesfreud. London 412 061–2. [Recorded in St Barnabas' Church, London, 1/1986 (Variations) and in Walthamstow Assembly Hall, London, 1/1987 (the rest); piano: Bechstein.]
- Schumann, Robert, Piano Concerto in A minor Op. 54, Jorge Bolet, Berlin Radio Symphony Orchestra, Riccardo Chailly, Decca 417 112 2 CD
- Tchaikovsky, Piano Concerto No. 1 in B flat minor Op. 23, Orchestre Symphonique de Montréal, Charles Dutoit, Decca 421 181-2, recorded in St-Eustache (Quebec) Canada, May 1987.
- Liszt, Franz, Bolet Rediscovered: Liszt Recital, Jorge Bolet, RCA 63748, 04/03/2001
- J Brahms; R Schumann: Klaus Tennstedt Jorge Bolet, London Philharmonic Orchestra; Klaus Tennstedt, BBC Legends, BBCL42512
- GREAT PIANISTS OF THE 20TH CENTURY VOLUME 10: JORGE BOLET I.
  - Live in Carnegie Hall (25/2/1974): Bach-Busoni, Chaconne; Chopin, 24 Preludes; Strauss-Tausig, Man lebt nur eimanl and Nachtfalter; Schulz-Evler, Arabesques on The Blue Danube; Wagner-Liszt, Tannhäuser Overture; Moszkowski, La Jongleuse; Rubinstein, Staccato Etude.
  - Rachmaninoff's Transcriptions and Paraphrases (7/1973, RCA Studios, New York): Rimsky-Korsakov, The Flight of the Bumble-bee; Kreisler, Liebesleid and Liebesfreud; Mendelssohn, Scherzo from A Midsummer Night's Dream; Bach, Prelude (from Violin Partita No. 3); Mussorgsky, Hopak; Behr, Polka de W.R.; Tchaikovsky, Lullaby Op. 16 No. 1; Bizet, Menuet from L'Arlesienne.
  - Liszt-Donizetti, Reminiscences de Lucia de Lammermoor, 'rec. date unknown' stated, but this is the 1969 recording made for Ensayo.

== Instruments ==
Bolet endorsed and performed on Baldwin and C. Bechstein pianos worldwide.
