= David Froom =

American composer and college professor

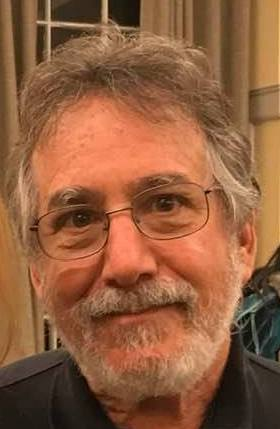

Background information
- Born: December 14, 1951; California, United States
- Died: June 19, 2022 (aged 70)
- Genres: Classical
- Occupations: Composer; Professor of Music
- Years active: 1977–2022
- Labels: Bridge; Navona; New Dimensions; Naxos; Arabesque; Capriccio; Centaur; Sonora; Crystal; Opus 3; Altissimo
- Spouse: Eliza Garth (m. 1986)
- Website: www.davidfroom.com

David Froom (December 14, 1951 – June 19, 2022) was an American composer and college professor. Froom taught at the University of Utah, the Peabody Institute, and the University of Maryland, College Park, and he was on the faculty at St. Mary's College of Maryland from 1989 until his death in 2022. He has received awards and honors from the Guggenheim Foundation, the American Academy of Arts and Letters, (the Charles Ives Scholarship, the Academy Award), the Fromm Foundation at Harvard, the Koussevitzky Foundation of the Library of Congress, the Barlow Foundation, and was a five-time recipient of an Individual Artist Award from the State of Maryland.

== Early life ==
Froom was born in 1951 in California. After playing rock music in a band with guitarist Gary Pihl and his brother Mitchell Froom, he earned a Bachelor of Arts degree from the University of California, Berkeley. As a graduate student, he studied under William Kraft, Humphrey Searle and Robert Linn (composer) at the University of Southern California, earning a Master of Music Composition degree in 1978. In 1984, he earned a D.M.A. degree in composition from Columbia University, where he studied with Mario Davidovsky and Chou Wen-chung. He had a Fulbright grant for study at Cambridge University, where he studied with Alexander Goehr, and fellowships to the Tanglewood Music Festival, the Wellesley Composers Conference, and MacDowell Colony.

== Composer ==
Froom wrote music for solo instruments, chamber ensembles, and orchestra, with and without voice. His music has been performed extensively throughout the United States by major orchestras, ensembles, and soloists, including, among many others, the Louisville, Seattle, Utah, League/ISCM, and Chesapeake Symphony Orchestras, the United States Marine and Navy Bands, the Chamber Music Society of Lincoln Center, the 21st Century Consort, Boston Musica Viva, the New York New Music Ensemble, the Haydn Trio Eisenstadt, and the Aurelia Saxophone Quartet. His music has been heard in performance in England, France, Germany, Austria, Italy, Holland, Cyprus, China, Australia, and New Zealand.

His music has been described as “intensely dramatic yet deeply formal,” “intellectually engaging, explosive with imagination and with a satisfying visceral power,” balancing “diatonic pastoralism with acerbic angularity, Stravinskian rhythmic urgency with lyrical counterpoint.” Among his most critically acclaimed works are “Circling,” Sonata for Solo Violin, 2nd Piano Trio, and Amichai Songs. Among his most frequently performed music is his saxophone music, which includes a saxophone quartet, “Flying High” for solo alto saxophone, and “Arirang Variations” for alto saxophone, bassoon, and piano. All of his works, are published by the American Composers Alliance.

Froom's work has, since 1991, appeared regularly on the concerts of the 21st Century Consort, the new music ensemble-in-residence at the Smithsonian Institution. They have premiered and recorded many of his works.

== Personal life ==
Froom was married to pianist Eliza Garth. They share two daughters, Rosalie and Ana.

== Awards ==
Froom's awards include the following:

- Shepherd Distinguished Composer of the Year (Music Teachers National Association)
- Academy Award, American Academy of Arts and Letters
- Fromm Foundation at Harvard Commission
- Barlow Foundation at Brigham Young University Commission
- Guggenheim Foundation Fellowship
- Maryland State Arts Council Individual Artist Award (five times)
- Koussevitzky Foundation Commission from the Library of Congress
- National Endowment for the Arts Composition Fellowship
- Kennedy Center Friedheim Awards First Prize
- Composition Fellow to the Composers Conference at Wellesley
- Fulbright-Hays Program Grant for study at Cambridge University (England)
- Charles Ives Prize from the American Academy of Arts and Letters

== Selected works ==
Groom's notable works include:

=== Large ensemble works ===
- ‘’Manna Variations’’ for wind ensemble
- ‘’Three Fantasy Dances: a Concerto for Wind Ensemble’’
- ‘’Amichai Songs’’ for baritone with orchestra
- ‘’Striking Silver’’ for orchestra
- ‘’Down to a Sunless Sea’’: a Rhapsody for string orchestra

=== Concerti ===
- ‘’Canzoni di Notte’’ for clarinet and orchestra
- ‘’Petali di Gelsomino’’ for flute and string orchestra
- Serenade for trumpet and strings

=== Chamber music ===
- ‘’Hidden Movies’’ for fl, cl, vn, vc, pno
- ‘’Before the Dawn’’ for alto saxophone and piano
- ‘’Nightsongs’’ for clarinet and piano
- ‘’Turn of Events’’ for saxophone and piano
- ‘’Lightscapes’’ for flute and piano
- ‘’Circling’’ for flute and clarinet (also arranged for two saxophones)
- Piano Trio No. 1
- Piano Trio No. 2 ‘’Borders’’
- Saxophone Quartet
- ‘’Arirang Variations’’ for alto saxophone, bassoon, piano
- Trio for Clarinet, Cello, Piano
- ‘’Fantasy Dances’’ for fl, cl, perc, pno, vn, va, vc
- ‘’Kick Off!’’ for brass septet
- Quintet for oboe, strings and piano
- Chamber Concerto for fl, cl, vn, vc, pno and perc
- Quartet for piano and strings
- String Quartet

=== Solo instrument ===
- ‘’Variations on an Early American Hymn Tune’’ for piano solo
- ‘’Eine Kleine Kleinmusik’’: Violinetude (solo violin), Violetude (solo viola), Violoncelletude (solo cello), Contrabassetude (solo bass)
- ‘’Ribbons’’ for solo flute
- ‘’Shades of Red’’ for solo violin, or viola, or cello
- Sonata for solo violin
- ‘’Flying High’’ for solo alto saxophone
- Piano Suite
- ‘’To Dance to the Whistling Wind’’ for solo flute
- Sonata for piano
- ‘’Elegy’’ for viola solo

=== Vocal music ===
- ‘’Amichai Songs’’ for baritone with orchestra
- ‘’Two Yeats Songs’’ for soprano and violin
- ‘’Colors passing through us’’ (poetry, Marge Piercy) for mez sop, cl, vc, pno
- ‘’Three Love Songs’’ (poetry, Sue Standing) for mezzo-soprano and piano
- ‘’Amichai Songs’’ for bar with fl, cl, hn, pno, vn, va, vc
- ‘’Emerson Songs’’ for sop with fl, ob, cl, bn, pno, vn, va, vc

=== Choral ===
- ‘’Warm are the still and lucky miles’’ for SATB (poem, Auden)

=== Recordings ===
- Quartet for Piano and Strings, Down to a Sunless Sea, Piano Sonata (Centaur Records CRC 2103).
- Serenade for trumpet and strings, Gerard Schwarz and the Seattle Symphony with Jeff Silberschlag, trumpet (Naxos 8.559719).
- Chamber Concerto (New York New Music Ensemble), String Quartet (Ciompi String Quartet), Quintet for Oboe, Strings and Piano (Twentieth Century Consort), Piano Suite (Eliza Garth). To Dance to the Whistling Wind (Jayn Rosenfeld) (Arabesque Recordings Z6710)
- “Kick Off!” for brass septet (Sonora Recordings SO22591CD)
- Piano Trio, Opus 3 Trio (Opus 3 Recordings)
- Saxophone Quartet, West Point Saxophone Quartet (Altissimo Recordings 75442259912)
- Saxophone Quartet, Aurelia Quartet (New Dynamic Records 700261228655)
- Saxophone Quartet, Quatour Nota Bene (Fidelio Recordings AD001)
- Piano Trio #2: “Grenzen,” Haydn Trio Eisenstadt (Capriccio Records CAP71095)
- Arirang Variations, Kenneth Tse, Benjamin Coehlo, Alan Huckleberry (Crystal Records CD358)
- Amichai Songs, Fantasy Dances, Circling, Emerson Songs, Clarinet Trio, 21st Century Consort (Bridge Records 9240)
- Sonata for Violin Solo, Curtis Macomber (Navonna Records NV5830)

== Bibliography ==
- “David Froom” by Perry Goldstein, in The New Grove Dictionary of American Music, 2nd ed., 2013
- “Trusting the Connections” by Alexandra Gardner, Spotlight Profile in New Music Box, April 18, 2012
- “A stylistic analysis of three flute pieces by David Froom: Circling for flute and clarinet, To Dance to the Whistling Wind for solo flute, and Lightscapes for flute and piano” by Candice Behrmann, University of Nebraska, Lincoln, DMA dissertation, 2010
- “Flute and Clarinet Together” by Joanna Cowan White in Flute Talk, September 2009
- “David Froom: MTNA/Shepherd Distinguished Composer 2006” by Ann Rivers Witherspoon in American Music Teacher, June–July, 2007
- “David Froom” by Perry Goldstein, in The New Grove Dictionary of Music and Musicians, 2nd ed., 2001

== Articles written ==
- David Froom, “The Emerging Generation,” keynote article in Contemporary Music Review, Volume 10, Part 1.
- David Froom, “Looking Back, Looking Forward,” and “Composed in Southern Maryland,” River Gazette, volume 10, no. 3, Fall 2010
- David Froom, “Classical Music to Unite a Community” New Music Box, July 20, 2011
