= Eliza Garth =

American concert pianist and recording artist

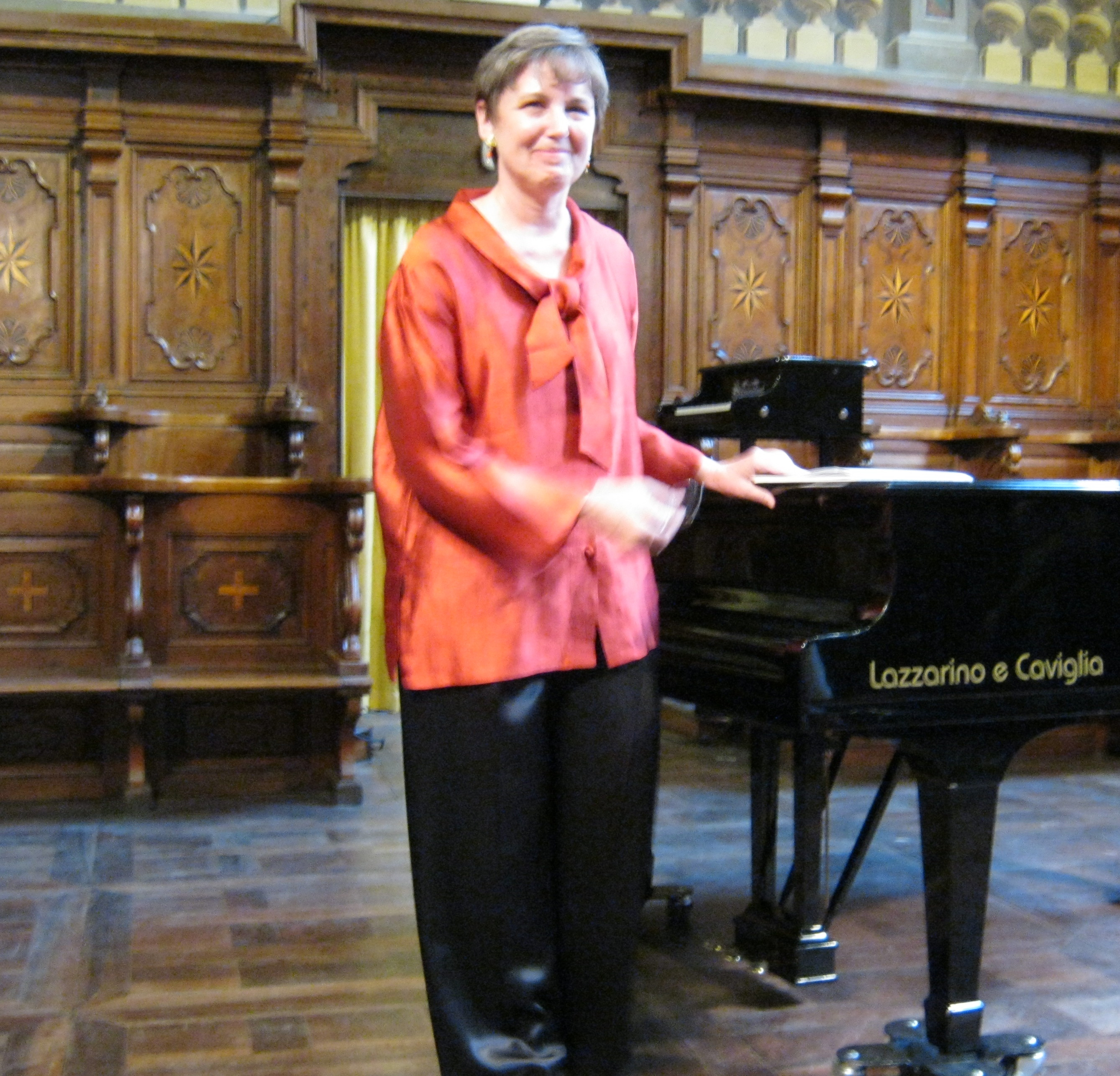
- Eliza Garth performing at the Alba Music Festival in 2011 (Alba, Italy)

Background information
- Born: September 15, 1954 (age 72)
- Origin: United States
- Genre: Classical
- Instrument: Piano
- Years active: 1977–present
- Labels: Centaur; Albany Records
- Spouse: David Froom (m. 1986)
- Website: http://www.elizagarth.com

Eliza Garth (born September 15, 1954) is an American concert pianist and recording artist, noted for her performances and recordings of music written since 1900. She was a student of Abbey Simon at The Juilliard School.

== Early life and education ==
In her teens, Garth studied privately with Armin Watkins, a respected pianist and faculty member at The University of South Florida. She is a graduate of the Boston University School for the Arts (BMUS magna cum laude; MMUS), and The Juilliard School (Postgraduate Diploma).

== Professional career ==
Garth made her New York recital debut in Merkin Concert Hall with a program of solo and chamber works by Alban Berg that included the Chamber Concerto for Piano, Violin, and Thirteen Wind Instruments, conducted by Harvey Sollberger. She has performed over 200 new works over the course of her career; many of these performances were major premieres, including works by Oliver Knussen, Judith Weir, George Benjamin, John Watrous, and Scott Wheeler. During John Cage’s centennial year, she gave multiple performances of his landmark work for prepared piano, Sonatas and Interludes. Garth’s recordings include the complete solo piano works of Donald Martino, winner of the Pulitzer Prize, as well as works by Paul Moravec, Sheree Clement, Perry Goldstein, and David Froom.

She has performed throughout the United States and in England, France, Italy, the Netherlands, and China. In addition, her performances have been heard on major radio stations, including WNYC, WQXR, WBUR, Radio Suisse Romande (Geneva), and the BBC Radio 3 program “Music in Our Time.”

Garth has been lauded for her “exquisite ear for piano sound” and for “a touch that allowed for almost ethereal transparency.” In response to one of her live performances of Donald Martino’s Fantasies and Impromptus, New York Times critic Bernard Holland stated that “[o]ne can think of no one better qualified to play this intricate, shining music.” New York Times critic Anthony Tommasini included Garth's recording of Fantasies and Impromptus in a Times listing of his five favorite recordings of music composed since World War II.

She was a founding member of the Chamber Players of the League of Composers / International Society for Contemporary Music (ISCM) in New York City, and has appeared as a guest artist with ensembles such as The New York New Music Ensemble, Parnassus, and Collage.
