= Robert Linn (composer) =

American composer and educator

- Born: August 11, 1925; San Francisco, California, U.S.
- Died: October 28, 1999 (aged 74)
- Genres: Classical
- Occupation: Composer
- Years active: 1957–1990

Robert Linn (August 11, 1925 – October 28, 1999) was an American composer and an educator at the University of Southern California. His notable students there included Morten Lauridsen, Billy Childs, Donald Crockett, and David Froom.

His works include music for symphony orchestra, wind orchestra, chorus and chamber ensembles. Linn served as the chair of USC's Composition Department for 17 years prior to his retirement in 1990.
