= Alan Weiss (musician) =

American musician (born 1950)

Alan Weiss (born 1950 in New York City) is an American musician. His first instrument was classical guitar, which he studied with Andrés Segovia. When he was ten years old he changed definitively to the piano, studying with David Saperton. In 1978, Alan Weiss participated in the International Queen Elisabeth music competition, where he was the choice of the public and received 4th prize.
