= Jacques Abram =

American classical pianist

- Born: August 6, 1915
- Origin: American
- Died: October 5, 1998 (aged 83)
- Occupations: Composer, Pianist

Jacques Abram (August 6, 1915 – October 5, 1998), born Jack Gregory Abram, an American classical pianist, was born in Lufkin, Texas and died in Tampa, Florida.

Abram began improvising at age 3 and performing in public at age 6. As a youth he studied with Ima Hogg and Ruth Burr of Houston. At the urging of Ignace Jan Paderewski and Josef Hofmann, who had heard Abram in concert, his parents enrolled him in the Curtis Institute, where he studied with David Saperton. At age 13, Abram transferred to the Juilliard School, where he continued his studies with Ernest Hutcheson. The well-known pianist and Leschetizky pupil Arthur Shattuck also mentored Abram for many years. The National Federation of Music Clubs awarded Abram its Schubert Memorial Award in 1937. As a result of winning these awards Abram debuted with the Philadelphia Orchestra at Carnegie Hall performing the MacDowell D minor concerto.

During World War II, Abram was stationed with a special services unit in San Antonio, Texas. He became the artist in residence at Oklahoma College for Women, Chickasha, Oklahoma, in 1955, where he numbered among his devoted pupils Margaret McConnell, Larry Graham, Karen Reynolds, and Leon Whitesell. He assumed the same position in Toronto, Ontario, Canada's University of Toronto and Royal Conservatory of Music in 1960, and in 1963 he moved to Tampa, Florida, where he was on the faculty of the University of South Florida.

In 1948, Abram gave the American premiere of Benjamin Britten's piano concerto in Salt Lake City, Utah. In 1949 he gave the work its New York premiere under the baton of Leopold Stokowski, and on January 25, 1956, he was soloist in the work's first recording, with the Philharmonia Orchestra under Herbert Menges. EMI has reissued that recording on compact disc. According to the composer, Abram also gave the first English and US performances of Arthur Benjamin's 1949 Concerto quasi una Fantasia; in Benjamin's words, "Jacques Abram, the American pianist, gave it its first English performance at the Cheltenham Festival in 1952 and the first American performance in San Antonio in 1953."

In 1955, he married Christine Dorsey, and was the father of Jonathan, Gregory and Nell Abram.
