= Frances Ziffer =

American composer, conductor and pianist

Frances Ziffer (June 5, 1917 – November 7, 1996) was an American composer, conductor, and pianist. She attended the Peabody Institute and studied with Carl Friedberg and David Saperton. She was a music director for theater groups and wrote lyrics or composed music for at least six musicals, as well as for numerous songs. Ziffer married Joseph Burgio but published her works under the name "Ziffer," sometimes collaborating with Hortense Belson.

Her compositions include:

== Musicals ==
- A Streetcar Named Desire (play by Tennessee Williams; music by Frances Ziffer)
- Dakota (book by Tom Hill; music and lyrics by Hortense Belson, Hardy Wieder, Frances Ziffer)
- Dames at Sea
- Little Brown Jug (book by Tom Hill; lyrics by Hortense Belson; music by Frances Ziffer)
- Surprise Package (book by Tom Hill; music and lyrics by Hortense Belson, Hardy Wieder and Frances Ziffer)
- Three on a Bed: A Musical Satire (words by Hortense Belson and Thomas Hill; music by Frances Ziffer)

== Songs ==
- "Faith Alone" (with Martin Kalmanoff and Hardy Wieder)
- "He Don't Wanna Love Me" (with Martin Kalmanoff and Hardy Wieder)
- "I Didn't Hear From You" (words by Eugene Cohen; music by Frances Ziffer)
- "If and When it Happens" (words by Eugene Cohen; music by Frances Ziffer)
- "I'll Know Better Next Time"
- "I'm Only Waiting" (words by Hardy Wieder; music by Frances Ziffer)
- "In My Wildest Dreams"
- "Just Passing By"
- "Love is Always New" (words by Hardy Wieder; music by Frances Ziffer)
- "No Ifs, Ands or Buts"
- "One Foot to Sea" (with Martin Kalmanoff and Hardy Wieder)
- "Pretty, Pretty Please" (words by Eugene Cohen; music by Frances Ziffer)
- "Reward, Reward"
- "Running Through My Mind"
- "Say When" (with Martin Kalmanoff and Hardy Wieder)
- "The Pleasure's All Mine"
- "There's Only One You"
- "Which Way is the Way to Your Heart"
