= Piano Concerto No. 4 (Rubinstein) =

Piano concerto by Anton Rubinstein

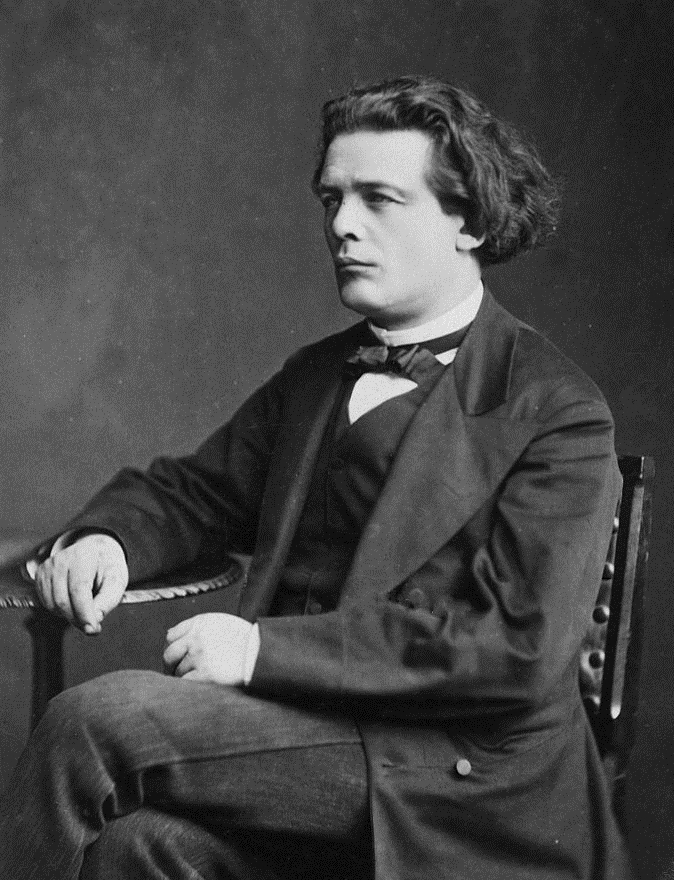
Anton Rubinstein c. 1880

The Piano Concerto No. 4 in D minor, Op. 70, by Anton Rubinstein is a Romantic concerto for piano and orchestra. It was among Rubinstein's best-known concert works and remained in the repertoire of several major virtuoso pianists in the late nineteenth and early twentieth centuries.

Rubinstein, himself a celebrated pianist, left five numbered piano concertos. He composed the Fourth Concerto in 1864; the work was first published in 1865 and was dedicated to the violinist Ferdinand David.

== Movements ==
The concerto is in three movements:

1. Moderato assai
2. Andante
3. Allegro

== Selected discography ==
- Josef Hofmann; unspecified orchestra; conductors Artur Rodziński and Karl Krueger. The Complete Josef Hofmann, Vol. 8: Concerto and Solo Performances 1938–1947. Marston Records 52044-2.
- Joseph Banowetz; Slovak State Philharmonic Orchestra, Košice; Robert Stankovsky, conductor. Rubinstein: Piano Concertos Nos. 3 and 4. Marco Polo 8.223382.
- Marc-André Hamelin; BBC Scottish Symphony Orchestra; Michael Stern, conductor. Rubinstein & Scharwenka: Piano Concertos. Hyperion CDA67508.
- Sung-Suk Kang; Plovdiv Philharmonic Orchestra; Nayden Todorov, conductor. Rubinstein: Piano Concerto No. 4 in D minor, Op. 70. Music Minus One MMO3079 / Hal Leonard 00400244.
- Joseph Moog; Deutsche Staatsphilharmonie Rheinland-Pfalz; Nicholas Milton, conductor. Rachmaninov: Piano Concerto No. 3 / Rubinstein: Piano Concerto No. 4. Onyx Classics ONYX4089.
