= Josef Hofmann =

Polish-American pianist (1876–1957)

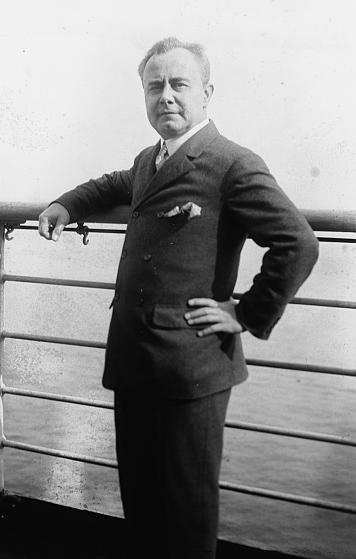
- Born: Józef Kazimierz Hofmann; January 20, 1876; Podgórze, Kingdom of Galicia and Lodomeria, Austria-Hungary
- Died: February 16, 1957 (aged 81); Los Angeles, California, U.S.
- Resting place: Forest Lawn Memorial Park, Glendale, California
- Spouses: Marie Eustis (m. 1905–1924) Betty Short (m. 1924–1957)
- Children: 4, including Josef Anton Hofmann

Josef Casimir Hofmann (originally Józef Kazimierz Hofmann; January 20, 1876 – February 16, 1957) was a Polish-American pianist, composer, music teacher, and inventor.

== Childhood ==
Josef Hofmann was born in Podgórze (currently part of Kraków), in Austro-Hungarian Galicia (present-day Poland) in 1876. His father was the composer, conductor and pianist Kazimierz Hofmann, and his mother the singer Matylda Pindelska. He had an older sister – Zofia Wanda (born June 11, 1874, also in Kraków). Throughout their childhood, their father, Kazimierz, was married to Aniela Teofila née Kwiecińska (born January 3, 1843, in Warsaw), who, after moving to Warsaw in 1878 with her husband, died there on October 12, 1885. Then the next year Kazimierz Mikołaj Hofmann married on June 17, 1886, Matylda Franciszka Pindelska - the mother of his children, (daughter of Wincenty and Eleonora née Wyszkowska, b. in 1851 in Kraków) in the Holy Cross Church in Warsaw.

In order to ensure their son Josef a thorough musical education, the whole family moved to Berlin from 1886. Josef Hofmann, a child prodigy, gave a debut recital in Warsaw at the age of 5, and a long series of concerts throughout Europe and Scandinavia, culminating in a series of concerts in America in 1887-88 that elicited comparisons with the young Mozart and the young Mendelssohn. The young Hofmann took music lessons from Heinrich Urban (composition) and with the pianist and composer Moritz Moszkowski.

=== Career as a child prodigy ===
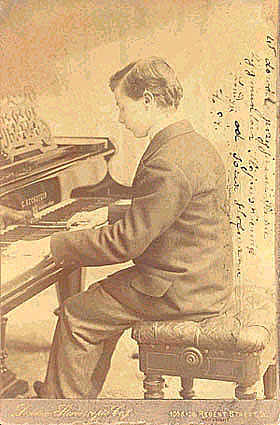
Hofmann as a young man at the keyboard

Anton Rubinstein heard the seven-year-old Hofmann play Beethoven's C minor Piano Concerto in Warsaw and declared him to be an unprecedented talent. At Rubinstein's suggestion, German impresario Hermann Wolff offered career management and offered to send the boy on a European tour, but Hofmann's father refused to let the boy travel until he was nine years old. At that age, Hofmann gave concerts in Germany, France, Holland, Norway, Denmark, Sweden, and Great Britain.

At the age of 12, young Josef Hofmann was probably the first pianist of note to record on Edison's phonograph; Hans von Bülow recorded a Chopin Mazurka on Edison's improved phonograph the same year, i.e., 1888.

In 1887, an American tour was arranged, with three months of performances that included fifty recitals, seventeen of which were at the Metropolitan Opera House. Yet soon after, the Society for the Prevention of Cruelty to Children stepped in, citing the boy's fragile health. However, as per the contract that had paid Hofmann $10,000, he was legally obliged to complete the tour. The contract was rendered void by Alfred Corning Clark who donated $50,000 and, in turn, legally forbade Hofmann to perform in public until he turned 18 years old. The final segment of the tour was cancelled and the family returned to Potsdam, outside Berlin. This marked the end of Hofmann's child prodigy years. (See and for details.)

Subsequently, Anton Rubinstein took Hofmann as his only private student in 1892 and arranged the debut of his pupil in Hamburg, Germany, in 1894. Hofmann toured and performed extensively over the next 50 years as one of the most celebrated pianists of the era.

=== Education in music ===
Clark's donation enabled Hofmann to continue individual study in science and mathematics, and he continued to take music lessons from Heinrich Urban (composition) and with the pianist and composer Moritz Moszkowski. In 1892, Rubinstein accepted Hofmann as his only private pupil, the two meeting for 42 sessions in Dresden's Hotel d'Europe. Initial lessons, a week apart, included ten Bach Preludes and Fugues and two Beethoven sonatas, from memory. Hofmann was never allowed to bring the same composition twice, as Rubinstein said as a teacher he would probably forget what he told the student during the previous lesson. Rubinstein never played for Hofmann, but gave ample evidence of his pianistic outlook during many recitals the boy heard. In a three-day period Hofmann heard in Berlin's new Bechstein Hall recitals by Hans von Bülow, Johannes Brahms and Rubinstein, and commented on their radically different playing. Rubinstein arranged Hofmann's adult debut on March 14, 1894, in Hamburg's Symphonic Assembly Hall, the piece being Rubinstein's Piano Concerto No. 4 in D minor, with the composer conducting. After the concert, Rubinstein told Hofmann there would be no more lessons, and they never saw each other again. Rubinstein returned to Russia and died later that year. In later years Hofmann referred to his relationship with the titanic Russian master as the "most important event in my life.".

== Musical career ==
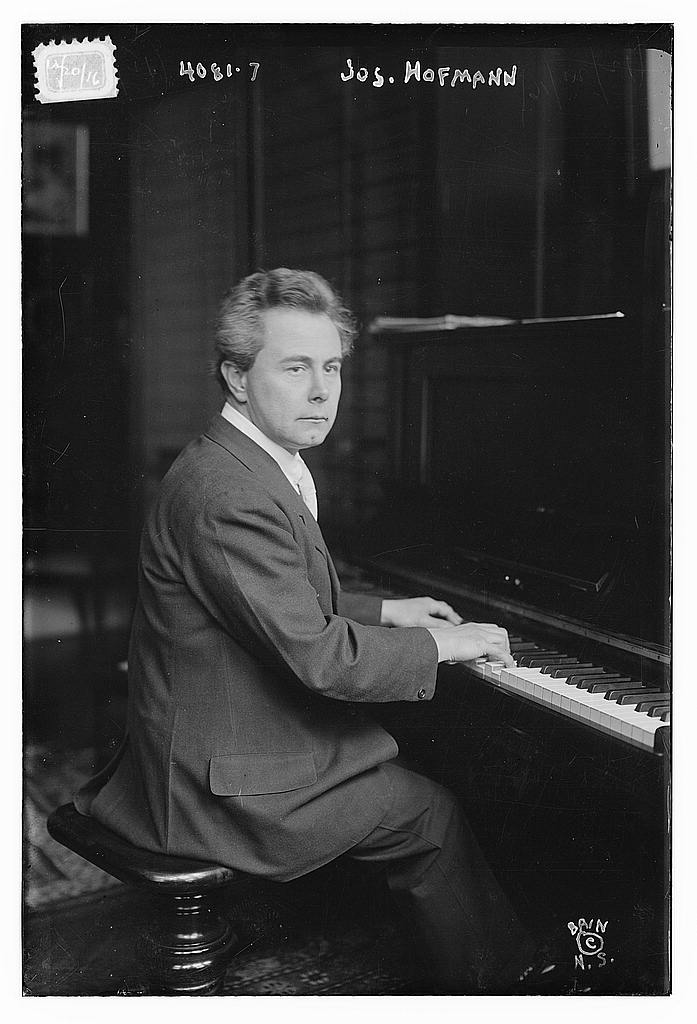
Hofmann in 1916

As a composer, Hofmann published over one hundred works, many of those under the pseudonym Michel Dvorsky, including two piano concertos and ballet music. He made the United States his base during World War I and became a US citizen in 1926. In 1924, he became the first head of the piano department at the inception of the Curtis Institute of Music, Philadelphia; he became the institute's director in 1927 and remained so until 1938. In 1913, he was presented with a set of keys to the city of St. Petersburg, Russia.

He was instrumental in recruiting illustrious musicians such as Efrem Zimbalist, Fritz Reiner, Marcella Sembrich, Isabella Vengerova, Moriz Rosenthal, Wilhelm Backhaus, Benno Moiseiwitsch, Abram Chasins, David Saperton, Wanda Landowska, and Leopold Auer to the Curtis faculty. Hofmann's pupils included Jacques Abram, Jeanne Behrend, Abram Chasins, Shura Cherkassky, William Harms, Harry Kaufman, Angelica Morales von Sauer, Ezra Rachlin, Nadia Reisenberg (see), Abbey Simon, Lucie Stern, and Ruth Slenczynska. While not a pupil, Jorge Bolet benefited from Hofmann's interest. In 1937, the 50th anniversary of his New York debut performance was celebrated with gala performances including a "Golden Jubilee" recital at the Metropolitan Opera, New York City.

By the early 1930s, Hofmann had become an alcoholic but he retained exceptional pianistic command throughout this decade; Rudolf Serkin and a young Glenn Gould have recounted magical impressions created on them by Hofmann's concerts in the middle and late 1930s. After his departure from the Curtis Institute in 1938, a combination of his drinking, marital problems and a loss of interest in performing caused a rapid deterioration in his artistic abilities. Commenting on Hofmann's sharp decline, Sergei Rachmaninoff said, "Hofmann is still sky high ... the greatest pianist alive if he is sober and in form. Otherwise, it is impossible to recognize the Hofmann of old". Oscar Levant wrote, "one of the terrible tragedies of music was the disintegration of Josef Hofmann as an artist. In his latter days, he became an alcoholic. …[H]is last public concert … was an ordeal for all of us".

In the years from 1939 to 1946, his artistic eminence deteriorated, in part due to family difficulties and alcoholism. In 1946, he gave his last recital at Carnegie Hall, home to his 151 appearances, and retired to private life in 1948.

== Technique and style ==
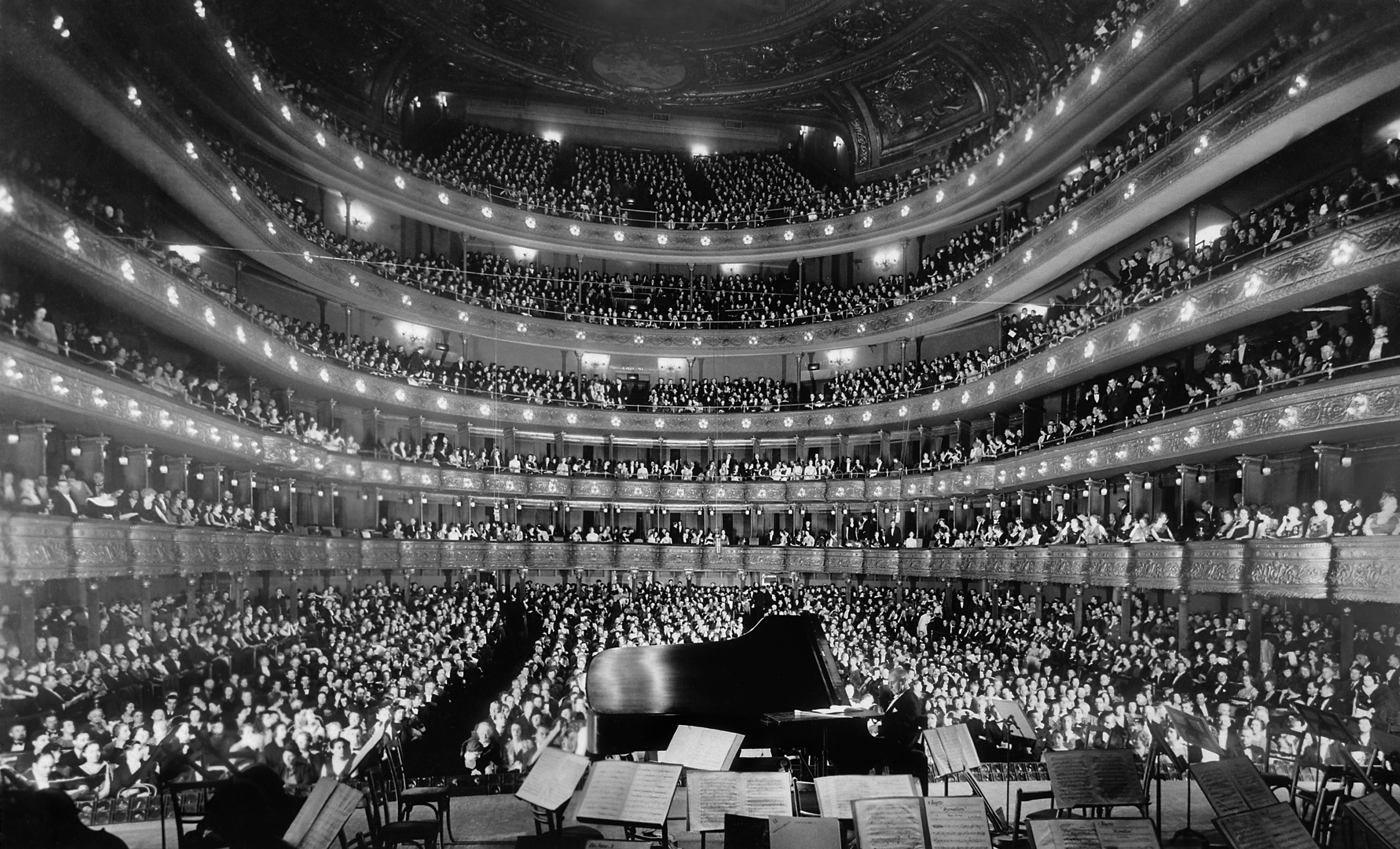
Josef Hofmann playing solos in the Metropolitan Opera House gala on November 28, 1937, the 50th anniversary of his American debut.

Hofmann's views on technique and musicianship are explained in his book Piano Playing with Questions Answered. He had small but exceptionally strong hands. Steinway eventually built for him custom keyboards with slightly narrower keys (pianist/critic Stephen Hough has commented on how Hofmann's mechanical understanding of the Steinway piano action set him apart from all other pianists.) His concert instruments had subtle action changes for faster repetition, two pedals rather than three (he liked the older Steinway trap work geometry), faultless regulation, and were accompanied on tours by his own recital chair, built with a short folding back and a 1½" slope from rear to front. After playing Hofmann's special concert instrument in the Steinway New York basement, Gunnar Johansen reported that the piano had the biggest sonority of any he had ever tried.

Unlike Rubinstein, Hofmann sat quietly at the piano, striking the keys in a kneading manner. His finger staccato was at the time unequaled, as was his orchestral sonority. According to his student Nadia Reisenberg, he continuously used a combination of finger pedalling and foot pedalling. The New York Times critic Harold C. Schonberg said Hofmann had all of Leopold Godowsky's technique, a claim approved by Godowsky himself. By his own admission, Sergei Rachmaninoff, in his 40s, prepared for a career as a concert pianist by practicing over 15 hours a day with the goal of attaining the level of Hofmann's technique. When pianist Ralph Berkowitz was asked if Vladimir Horowitz had the greatest technique of all the pianists he had heard, Berkowitz replied that Horowitz indeed was the supreme master of the technical parts of performance, but one older era pianist was his equal - Hofmann.

Hofmann's approach and style can be summarized by his motto "an aristocrat never hurries". He often stated that Rubinstein and Moriz Rosenthal were the only pianists who had influenced his art, and admired singers Mattia Battistini and Marcella Sembrich. He adopted a more demonstrative style in live performances but a subtle and restrained style for his studio recordings; in both cases, he mostly adhered to the printed score, occasionally doubling left-hand octaves, and shunned sentimentality. He put spontaneity rather than structure foremost and admitted to Rachmaninoff that "I do not know how to build a composition ... occasionally, it happens to sound well". Schonberg wrote that among Hofmann's contemporaries, only Godowsky had the finish and refinement of Hofmann but lacked Hofmann's color, fire, and "red blood", while only Ferruccio Busoni and Rachmaninoff were ever mentioned by contemporaries as Hofmann's equals. After hearing a performance of Chopin's B minor Sonata by Hofmann, Rachmaninoff cut that piece from his own repertoire saying "not since Anton Rubinstein have I heard such titanic playing".

Suggested examples illustrating Hofmann's style:

- Rubinstein's Contradanses
- Chopin's Andante Spianato and Grande Polonaise Op.22
- Chopin's Ballade Op.23
- 2nd Movement from Beethoven's Sonata Op.31 No.3
- Rachmaninoff's Prelude Op.23 No.5
- Liszt's Hungarian Rhapsody No.2
- Stojowski's Caprice Orientale (dedicated to him by Sigismond Stojowski).

== Repertoire, musical ear and memory ==
Hofmann's repertoire was mostly confined to music written before the start of the 20th century. Much like Rubinstein's seven historic recitals of 1885, he gave 21 consecutive concerts in St. Petersburg without repeating a single piece, playing 255 different works from memory during that marathon cycle in 1912–1913. In the diary his wife kept during his 1909 Russian tour, she mentions his raising his eyebrows when he saw Brahms' Handel Variations on a program—a piece he had not played or even looked at for two and a half years. He played the work at the concert without hesitation. Although a poor sight reader, he was said to possess the ability of Franz Liszt and Camille Saint-Saëns to hear a composition once and play it back correctly without seeing the printed notes. Rosina Lhévinne recalled that Hofmann heard her husband Josef Lhévinne play Liszt's Lorelei, a piece Hofmann had never heard but went on to play it "just like my Josef (Lhevinne)" for an encore at his concert later that day. Maurice Aronson, who served as Leopold Godowsky's assistant, recalled Hofmann learning Godowsky's Fledermaus transcription. Godowsky and Hofmann met in Berlin in 1900, becoming friends until Godowsky's death in 1938. Hofmann would visit Godowsky's studio and listen while Godowsky was composing Fledermaus. A week later Hofmann visited Godowsky again and played the entire transcription, and he had never seen the music. Godowsky, in fact, had not yet written it down. Schonberg has added that Godowsky's Fledermaus is one of the most resourceful and complicated stunts ever written for the piano.

== Recordings ==
Hofmann started recording in studios in the 1880s but was never satisfied with the available technology and made only test pressings after 1923; he considered the test pressings made for His Master's Voice in November 1935 to be a worthwhile representation of his art. In the 1940s he recorded for the Bell Telephone Hour radio programs of which some rare footage remains, including Rachmaninoff's Prelude in C♯ minor, Op. 3, No. 2, and Beethoven's Concerto in E♭ major, "Emperor". Gregor Benko has remarked that Hofmann should not have appeared on many of the Bell Telephone Hour broadcasts since, by this time, his pianistic control had deteriorated considerably though the tonal palette was still immense and the phrasing provocative (see and). Hofmann's student Jeanne Behrend, after first hearing the recordings from 1940 to 1946, stated "well, it's his playing, but nothing like what we heard in the 1920s."

Cylinders recorded c. 1890 for Thomas Edison were some of the earliest recordings of classical music and were lost during World War I. Four cylinders made in Russia in 1895–1896, with music by Mendelssohn, Louis Brassin and Rubinstein, have been recently discovered and issued on CD. He made two series of reproducing piano rolls, including in 1913 23 pieces for Welte-Mignon but did not trust rolls as an accurate representation of his playing. Hofmann recorded acoustic discs from 1912 to 1923 for Columbia and Brunswick, but felt the representation of his chaste and prismatic tonal palette was not captured. Hofmann experimented with short studio test recordings for RCA Victor in 1935 (which were released on LP by RCA in 1970), and in retirement in California experimented with piano string electrical pickups and designing an additional spruce soundboard under the piano lid. RCA Victor privately recorded the 50th anniversary concert of Hofmann's New York debut at the Metropolitan Opera House on November 28, 1937. At least two of his other concerts in 1930's were recorded live. These concert recordings exhibit an older Hofmann (age 60–62) in public just prior to the sharp decline in his pianistic command, and include sensational readings of Chopin's G minor Ballade, Andante Spianato and Grand Polonaise, A♭ Waltz (Op. 42) and F minor Ballade. All of these recordings have been published on compact discs under the auspices of Gregor Benko and audio restoration specialist Ward Marston.

== Inventions ==
As an inventor, Hofmann had over 70 patents, and his invention of pneumatic shock absorbers for cars and airplanes was commercially successful from 1905 to 1928. Other inventions included a windscreen wiper, a furnace that burned crude oil, a house that revolved with the sun, a device to record dynamics (U.S. patent number 1614984) in reproducing piano rolls that he perfected just as the roll companies went out of business, and piano action improvements adopted by the Steinway Company (U.S. patent number 2263088).

== Personal life ==
Hofmann spent his last decade in Los Angeles where he moved to in 1939 and lived in relative obscurity, working on inventions and keeping a steady correspondence with associates. He died there of pneumonia on February 16, 1957, at a nursing home. He had four children; a daughter and three sons. In 1928, it became public that Hofmann had divorced his first wife—Marie Eustis, with whom he had a daughter—in 1924 and had married his second wife—Betty Short, who had initially been one of his students—shortly thereafter. His eldest son, Josef Anton Hofmann, became a noted audio engineer.

== Stature ==
The 1917 New York Times article of James Huneker placing contemporary pianists, including Hofmann, in the context of the past legends.

Harold C. Schonberg has argued that Hofmann was the most flawless and possibly the greatest pianist of the 20th century. His Master's Voice and RCA unsuccessfully pursued recording projects with Hofmann in the 1930s. Sergei Rachmaninoff dedicated his Piano Concerto No. 3 in D minor (1909) to Hofmann, although Hofmann disliked it and never played it. Older generation critics such as James Huneker labeled Hofmann the "king of pianists", and Samuel Chotzinoff called him the "greatest pianist of our time." Contemporaries such as Rachmaninoff, Ignaz Friedman, Josef Lhévinne, and Godowsky considered Hofmann to be, overall, the greatest pianist of their generation, but the acclaim was not so universal from the next generation of pianists. In his autobiography Arthur Rubinstein criticized Hofmann as someone who took interest in only the mechanics of music and not in its heart or spirituality, and commented that at the end of Hofmann's career "he was left with nothing after his technique left him". Claudio Arrau dismissed Hofmann (along with Paderewski) as someone who only happened to be very famous and said "I didn't know what to do with him". Sviatoslav Richter, after listening to a Hofmann RCA test pressing of the Scherzo from Beethoven's Sonata in E♭, Op. 31, No. 3, considered the older pianist to be technically "stunning", but noted that Hofmann ignored the composer's sforzando markings; while György Sándor has called him the greatest of all 20th-century pianists in terms of music, interpretation, and technique. Hofmann's own student Shura Cherkassky compared Horowitz favorably with Hofmann as follows: "Hofmann was possibly the greater musical mind. But, I think, Horowitz was the greater pianist, the greater virtuoso—he somehow appealed to the whole world. Hofmann could not communicate on that level".

To balance the record, Earl Wild acknowledged Hofmann's style as the biggest influence on him gaining a fluid and flexible technique: ‘His interpretations were always delivered with great logic and beauty.’ Jorge Bolet is reported to have said that whenever he heard either Rachmaninoff or Hofmann, he always thought to himself, ‘Every note that they play – that is what I would like to play.’

The Josef Hofmann Piano Competition, co-sponsored by the American Council for Polish Culture and the University of South Carolina Aiken, was established in his honor in 1994.

== Bibliography ==
Hofmann's books were based on his frequent articles in the Ladies' Home Journal:

- Piano Playing: A Little Book of Simple Suggestions (1907) — e-text
- Piano Questions Answered (1909)
- Piano Playing: With Piano Questions Answered (1920, compilation of the first two books) — e-text, ISBN 0-486-23362-6 and ISBN 1-150-03067-4
