= Shura Cherkassky =

American classical pianist (1909–1995)

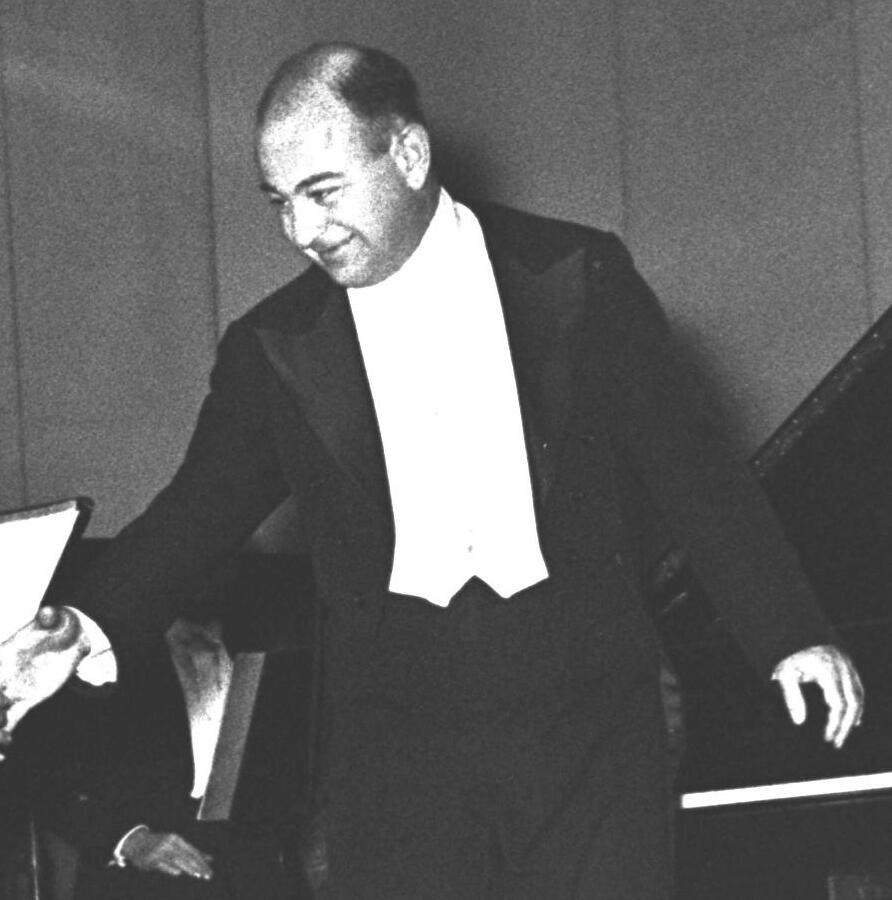
- Cherkassky with the Israel Philharmonic Orchestra in 1954
- Born: 7 October 1909; Odessa, Russian Empire
- Died: 27 December 1995 (aged 86); London, England
- Burial place: Highgate Cemetery, London, United Kingdom
- Occupations: Composer, pianist

Shura Cherkassky (Russian: Александр (Шура) Исаакович Черкасский; 7 October 1909 – 27 December 1995) was a Russian-American concert pianist known for his performances of the romantic repertoire. His playing was characterized by a virtuoso technique and singing piano tone. For much of his later life, Cherkassky resided in London.

== Early years ==
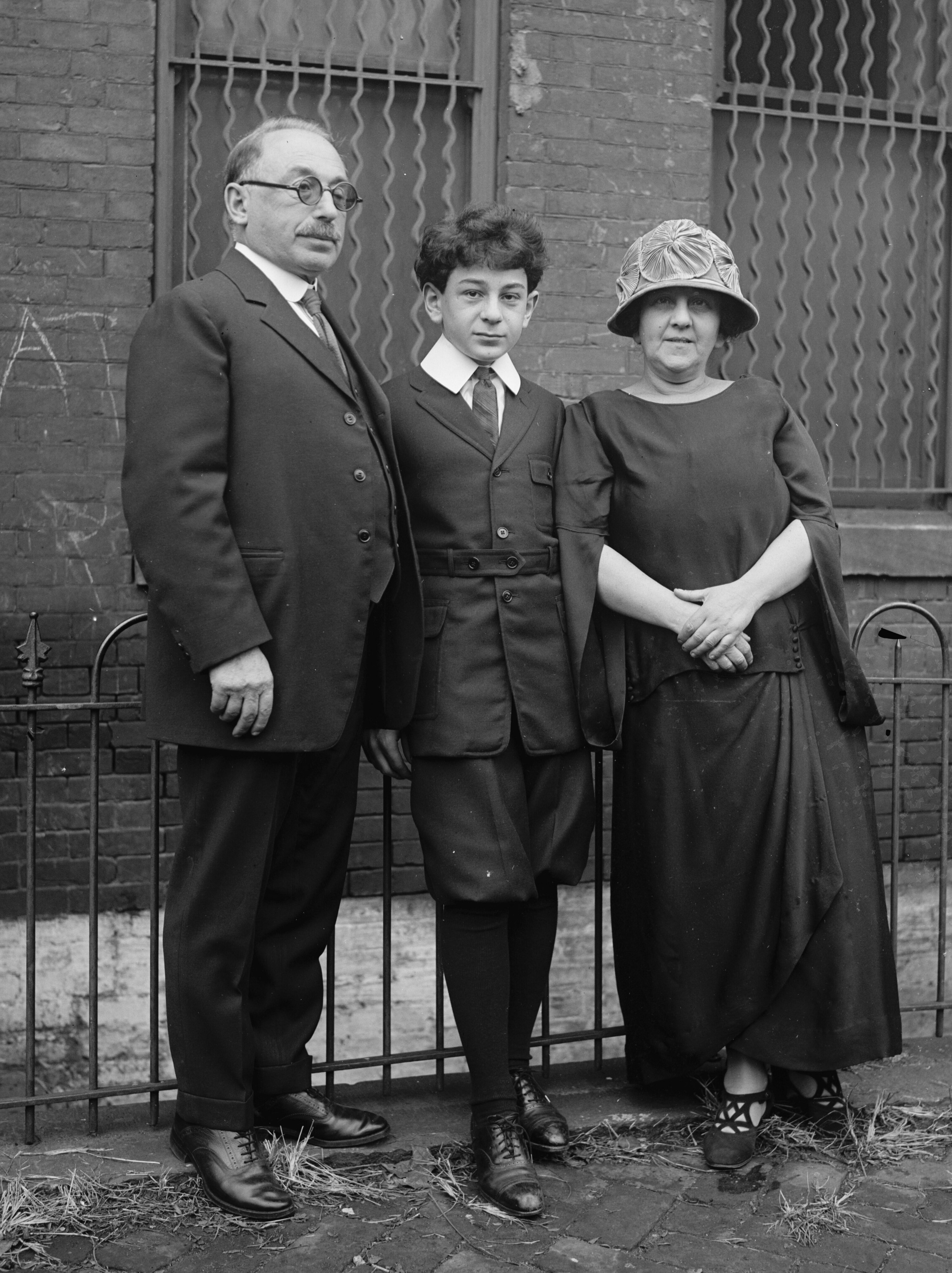
Cherkassky and his parents (1923)

Alexander Isaakovich Cherkassky (Shura is a diminutive form of Alexander) was born in Odessa (then part of the Russian Empire) in 1909. Cherkassky's family fled to the United States to escape the Russian Revolution. His family was Jewish.

Cherkassky's first music lessons were from his mother, Lydia Cherkassky, who had once played for Tchaikovsky in St. Petersburg. She also taught the pianist Raymond Lewenthal. In the United States, Cherkassky continued his piano studies at the Curtis Institute of Music under Josef Hofmann. Before studying with Hofmann, however, Cherkassky auditioned for Sergei Rachmaninoff, who advised him to give up performing for at least two years and to change the position of his hands at the keyboard. Conversely, Hofmann suggested Cherkassky should continue giving concerts, and this long association with public performance meant that Cherkassky felt comfortable before an audience. Hofmann also recommended that he practice for four hours every day, and Cherkassky did this religiously throughout his life, maintaining an extensive repertoire (baroque to Berio) to an exacting standard. His studies and advisory sessions with Hofmann continued until 1935. In the interim he began his lifelong obsession with world travel with trips to Australia, New Zealand, the Far East, Russia, and Europe.

Cherkassky performed actively until the end of his life, and many of his best recordings were made under live concert recital conditions.

== The California years ==
In the 1940s Cherkassky moved to California. He appeared at the Hollywood Bowl with conductors such as Sir John Barbirolli and Leopold Stokowski, and he played the sound track (Beethoven's Appassionata Sonata) for the Bette Davis 1946 film Deception. He also played Stravinsky's Three Pieces from Petrushka for the composer, who advised him to use the 'una corda' pedal for certain loud passages in order to obtain a particular special effect. Concert engagements were infrequent for Cherkassky in California during World War II.

== The London years ==
Although gay, he married Genia Ganz in 1946. The couple divorced two years later. In 1949 he had a great success in Hamburg playing Rachmaninoff's Rhapsody on a Theme of Paganini under Hans Schmidt-Isserstedt. This concert resulted in Cherkassky's popularity in Germany and Austria (Salzburg Festival) which lasted until the end of his life and confirmed him as one of the foremost pianists of the day. It was after his Wigmore Hall recital of 27 March 1957 that Cherkassky's career accelerated in the United Kingdom and following the death of his mother in Nice in 1961, he settled in London where he lived at The White House hotel until his death in 1995.

== Further touring ==
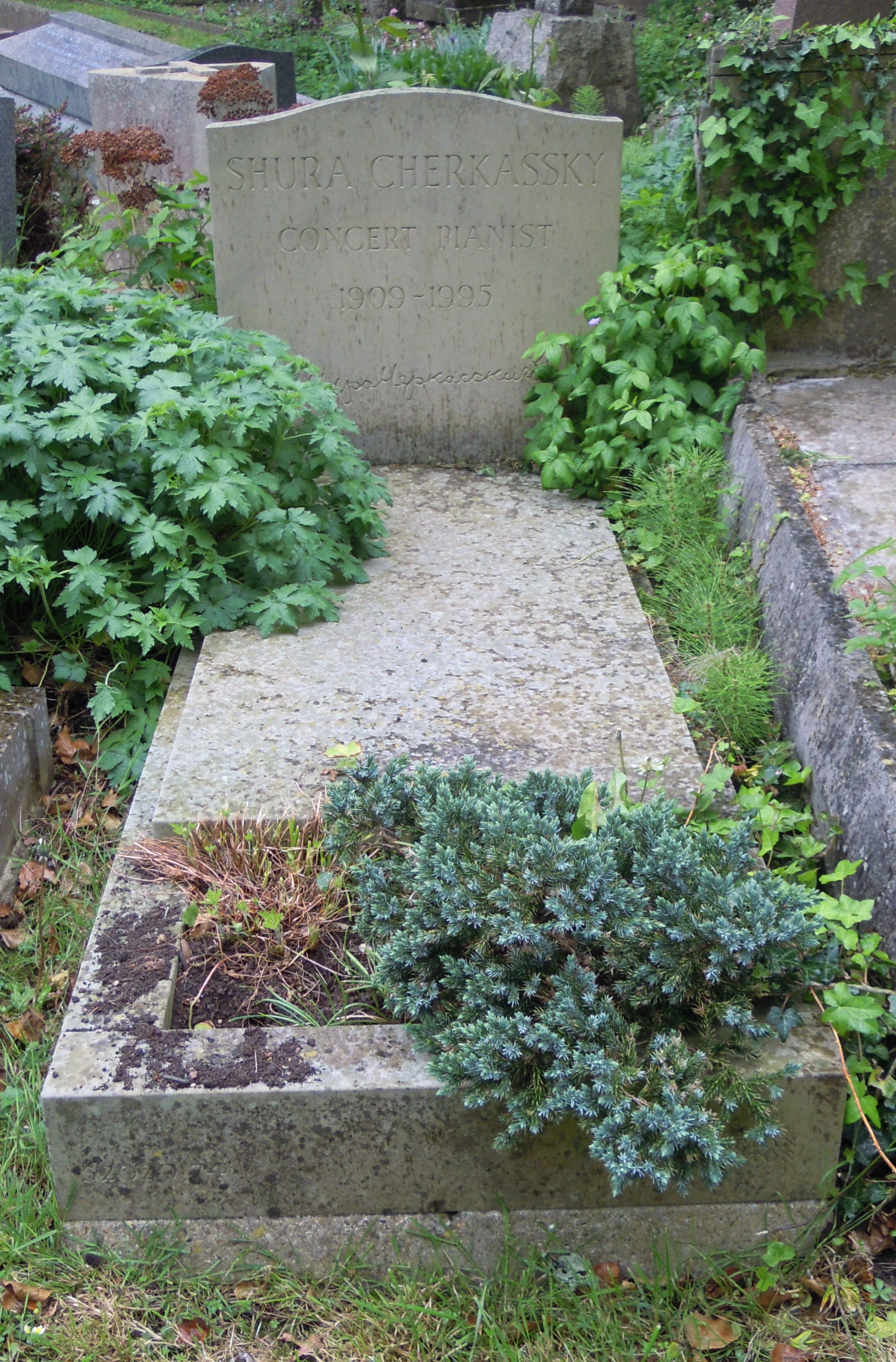
Cherkassky's grave in Highgate Cemetery

His career continued to reach great success with appearances at all the great concert venues of the world: the Concertgebouw in Amsterdam, the Herkulessaal in Munich, the Philharmonie in Berlin, the Musikverein in Vienna, the Théâtre des Champs-Élysées, at Suntory Hall in Tokyo and with all the world's great orchestras and conductors. Cherkassky's love of spontaneity and his dislike of a fixed standard performance meant that some conductors were reluctant to work with him. With Cherkassky, there was no guarantee that what was agreed in rehearsal would happen in concert. Cherkassky's performing career lasted for over 70 years, yet it was only in the last few decades of his life that he was recognized as one of the greatest pianists – a self-declared intuitive artist and exhibited kaleidoscopic possibilities of the piano.

Cherkassky died in London, aged 86, on 27 December 1995. He is buried in Highgate Cemetery, London, England.

== Recordings ==
Over seven decades of his concert career, starting in the 1920s, Cherkassky made a large number of recordings for RCA Victor, Vox, Swedish Cupol label, HMV, DG (the famous Tchaikovsky concerto recordings, and a later stereo recording of Franz Liszt's Hungarian Fantasy with the Berlin Philharmonic conducted by Herbert von Karajan), Tudor, Nimbus and Decca ('live' BBC recordings). He made his last recordings at age 85, in May 1995, seven months before his death. These were a selection of Rachmaninoff's pieces to act as fillers for his recording of Rachmaninoff's Piano Concerto No. 3 made the previous year.

== Discography ==
=== Releases by BBC Legends ===
- Shura Cherkassky - Chopin (BBCL 4057–2)
- Shura Cherkassky - Rachmaninoff Piano Concerto 3, Prokofiev Piano Concerto 2 (BBCL 4092–2)
- Shura Cherkassky / Sir Georg Solti - Tchaikovsky, Mussorgsky, Cherkassky, Rimsky-Korsakov (BBCL 4160–2)
- Shura Cherkassky - Rameau, Beethoven, Mendelssohn, Chopin, Scriabin, Tchaikovsky, Liszt (BBCL 4185–2)
- Shura Cherkassky - Handel, Brahms, Berg, Prokofiev, Chopin (BBCL 4212–2)
- Shura Cherkassky - Beethoven Piano Concerto 5, Gershwin Piano Concerto (BBCL 4231–2)
- Shura Cherkassky - Mendelssohn, Schubert, Schumann, Tchaikovsky arr. Rachmaninov, Schumann arr. Tausig (BBCL 4254–2)

=== Releases by Decca ===
- Kaleidoscope - Piano Encores
- Rachmaninoff - Piano Concerto No. 3 and others

==== Shura Cherkassky Live Series by Decca ====
- Vol.1 - Schubert . Chopin (433 653-2 DH)
- Vol.2 - 80th Birthday Recital from Carnegie Hall (433 654-2 DH)
- Vol.3 - Encores (433 651-2 DH)
- Vol.4 - Chopin: Sonata No.2 & 3 (433 650-2 DH)
- Vol.5 - Liszt (433 656-2 DH)
- Vol.6 - Schumann (433 652-2 DH)
- Vol.7 - Scriabin (Sonata n.4), Stravinsky (Petrushka), Ravel (Sonatine), Alban Berg (Sonata), Messiaen (ile de feu 1 & 2), Britten (Holiday Diary), Copland-Bernstein (433 657-2 DH)
- Vol.8 - Rachmaninoff, Brahms, etc. (433 655-2 DH)
- Anton Rubinstein - Piano Concerto No. 4 in D minor, Op. 70 + Encores (448 063-2 DH)

=== Releases by Deutsche Grammophon ===
- Tchaikovsky - Klavierkonzerte Nos. 1 & 2 (457 751–2)
- Liszt - Orchestral Works (453 130–2) (Cherkassky plays Fantasia on Hungarian Folk tunes, S.123 only. The rest of the recording is performed by the Berliner Philharmoniker, conducted by Herbert von Karajan)
- Chopin - Polonaises

=== Releases by Ivory Classics ===
- Shura Cherkassky - The Historic 1940s Recordings (2-CD Set) (CD-72003)
- Shura Cherkassky - 1982 San Francisco Recital (CD-70904)

=== Releases by Nimbus ===
- Shura Cherkassky (1909–1995) - Solo piano works by Chopin, Mussorgsky, Berg, Bernstein, Brahms, Schumann, Beethoven, Liszt, Stravinsky, Grieg and Rachmaninoff (6-CD Set) (NI 1733)
- Chopin, Liszt - The B minor Sonatas (NI 7701)
- The Art of the Encore (NI 7708)
- Shura Cherkassky (1909–1995) - Solo piano works by Chopin, Mussorgsky, Berg, Bernstein, Brahms, Schumann, Beethoven, Liszt, Stravinsky, Grieg and Rachmaninoff (7-CD Set) (NI 1748)
- Shura Cherkassky 'In Concert 1984' Vol 1 - Schumann, Brahms, Hofman, Chasins (NIM5020)
- Shura Cherkassky 'In Concert 1984' Vol 2 - Bach/Busoni, Berg, Liszt, Beethoven (NIM5021)

=== Releases by First Hand Records ===
- Shura Cherkassky in Concert, 1971 - venue unknown (First Hand Records FHR19)
- Shura Cherkassky 'The complete HMV stereo recordings' (2CDs) (First Hand Records FHR04) - Winner of the International Piano Awards "Best Reissue/Vintage Recording of 2009". Diapson D'OR, 10/2010

=== Other releases ===
- Rachmaninoff Piano Concertos Nos 2 & 3, Live Gothenburg 1970, 1968 (Cembal d'amour CD155)
- Duo-Art piano roll #66919, Liebeswalzer Op.57, No.5 Moszkowski (The Aeolian Company)
- The Young Shura Cherkassky (Biddulph)
- Piano Masters:- Vol.17: Shura Cherkassky (Pearl GEM 0138)
- Shura Cherkassky plays Liszt (Testament SBT 1033)
- Shura Cherkassky (Two Volumes) (Phillips Great Pianists of the 20th Century series)
- Debussy, Clair de Lune, Shura Cherkassky, 1993 (ASV Platinum PLT 8505)
- Shura Cherkassky 'The Complete UK World Record Club Solo Recordings' (2CDs) (Guild Historical GHCD 2398/99)
- Shura Cherkassky 'The Complete UK World Record Club Concerto Recordings' with Sir Adrian Boult (2CDs) (CRQ Editions CRQ CD369-370)

== Gallery ==
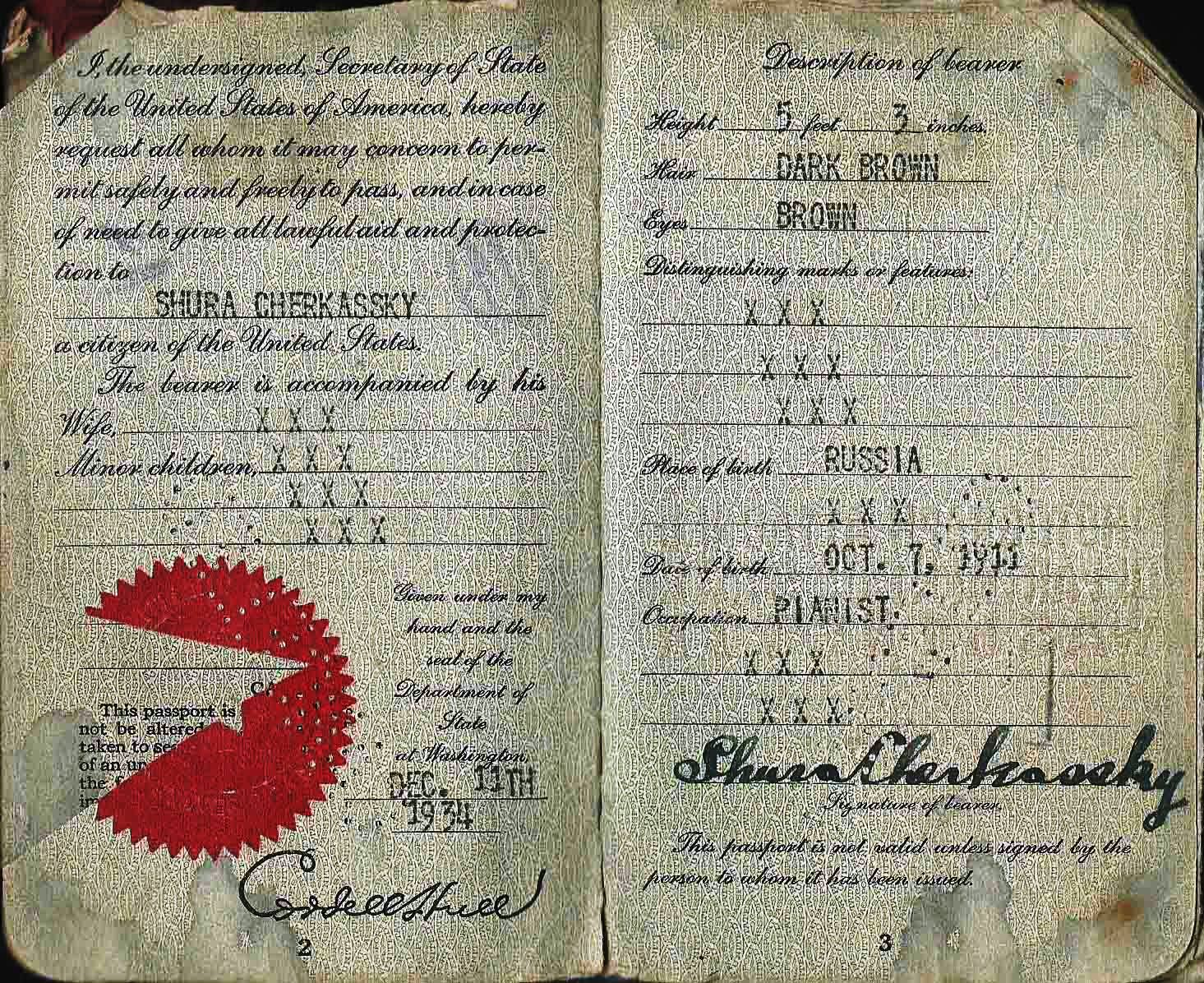
1934 US passport issued to 23-year-old Shura Cherkassky

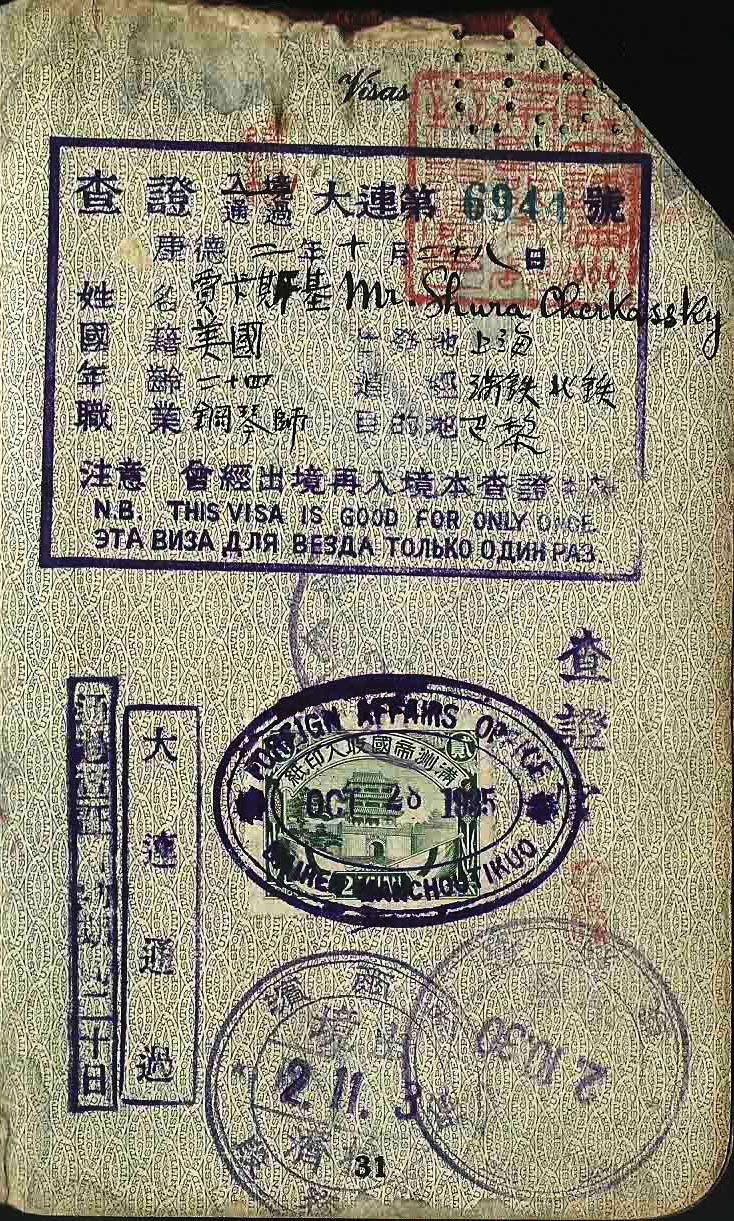
Shura Cherkassky's passport page with an entry into Manchuria from 1935

Shura Cherkassky 1963, photo dedicated on first of his three acclaimed Southern Africa tours organised by Hans Adler
