= Étude Op. 10, No. 3 (Chopin) =

1832 solo piano by Frédéric Chopin

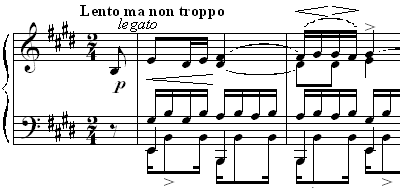
The beginning of Chopin's Étude Op. 10 No. 3

Étude Op. 10, No. 3, in E major, is a study for solo piano composed by Frédéric Chopin in 1832. It was first published in 1833 as the third piece of his Études Op. 10. This is a slow cantabile study for polyphonic and expressive legato playing. In fact, Chopin himself claimed that he had never "in his life written another such beautiful melody". It became famous through numerous popular arrangements. Although this étude is sometimes identified by the names "Tristesse" (Sadness) or "Farewell (L'Adieu)", neither is a name given by Chopin, but rather his critics.

== Significance ==
Étude No. 3
Performed by Edward Neeman

This étude differs from most of Chopin's in its tempo, its poetic character and the lingering yet powerful recitation of its cantabile melody. It marks a significant departure from the technical virtuosity required in standard études before Chopin's time, though, especially in the third volume of Muzio Clementi's Gradus ad Parnassum (1826), slow études for polyphonic playing, especially slower introductions to études, as well as études with alternating slower and faster sections, can easily be found. According to German scholar and Chopin biographer Frederick Niecks (1845–1924), Chopin said to his German pupil and copyist Adolph Gutmann (1819–1882) that he "had never in his life written another such beautiful melody ('chant'); and on one occasion when Gutmann was studying it the master lifted his arms with his hands clasped and exclaimed: 'O, my fatherland!' ("O, me [sic] patrie!")" Niecks writes that this study "may be reckoned among Chopin's loveliest compositions" as it "combines classical chasteness of contour with the fragrance of romanticism". American music critic James Huneker (1857–1921) believed it to be "simpler, less morbid, sultry and languorous, therefore saner, than the much be-praised study in C sharp minor (Étude Op. 25, No. 7)".

== Structure and stylistic traits ==
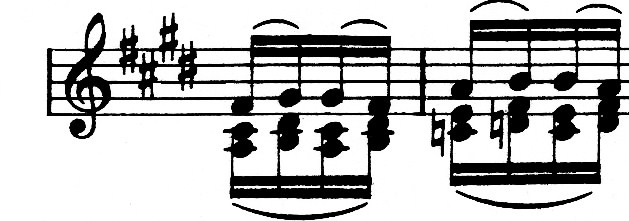
Bars 4–5 developed in "Debussian manner", noted by Alfredo Casella

Like most of Chopin's other études, this work is in ternary form (A–B–A). The A section is of remarkable melodic construction. Musicologist Hugo Leichtentritt (1874–1951) believes its asymmetric structure, (5 + 3) + (5 + 7) bars, to be highly relevant to the impact of the melody. The first five bars can be seen as a contraction of 4 + 4 bars with the final clause (consequent) of the prototypal eight-bar period replaced by bar 5. Italian composer and editor Alfredo Casella (1883–1947) notices the Pelléas-like effect of the oscillating major thirds in bars 4–5 anticipating Debussy by more than half a century. According to Leichtentritt bars 6–8 with its stretto and final ritenuto can be interpreted as the contraction of a four-bar clause. The melody is accompanied by oscillating semiquavers played by the right hand in a manner reminiscent of the Adagio cantabile movement of Beethoven's Sonata Pathétique while the syncopated rhythm in the left hand somewhat counteracts the simple "naiveté" of this oscillation. The melody itself is characterized by repeated notes. A novelty are the distinct crescendo and diminuendo signs allocated "polyphonically" and sometimes even differing in the two voices played by the right hand.

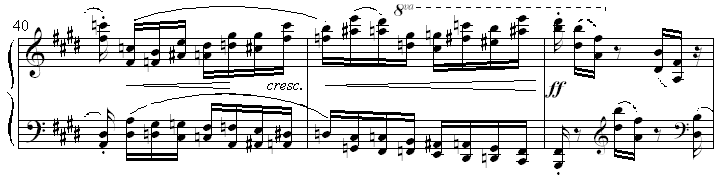
excerpt from the middle section of this étude (bars 40 – 42)

In the middle section (poco più animato), characterized by rhythmic shifts and sudden harmonic turns, theme and accompaniment are fused into oscillating double notes. There are five eight-bar phrases. Leichtentritt observes that each eight-bar phrase is "ruled by a new motif" and that "each of these segments surpasses the preceding one in sonority and brilliancy". The third period, although it stays chromatically centered around E major, is a long sequence of diminished seventh and tritone intervals, littered with accidentals and irregular rhythms difficult to play. It reaches a climax in the fourth period (bars 46–53), a bravura passage of double sixths for both hands. The fifth period (bars 54–61), leading back to the final restatement of the theme, can be described as an extended dominant seventh. Leichtentritt believes it to be "one of the most exquisite sound impressions ever contrived for the piano". Its effect is "based on its contrast with the fourth period and on the gradation of the most tender nuances in piano". The final A section is a quite literal though shortened restatement of the first one. At the end of the étude the fair copy autograph contains the directive attacca il presto con fuoco which means that Chopin foresaw the joint performance of both this étude and the following one.

This étude's similarity to a nocturne is frequently noted. Leichtentritt calls the étude a "nocturne like piece of intimate and rich cantabile melodics [gesangreicher, inniger Melodik], relieved in its middle section by a highly effective sound-unfolding [Klangentfaltung] of a novel and peculiarly original character [Gepräge]". German pianist and composer Theodor Kullak (1818–1882) called the study a "lovely poetic tone-piece".

== Tempo ==
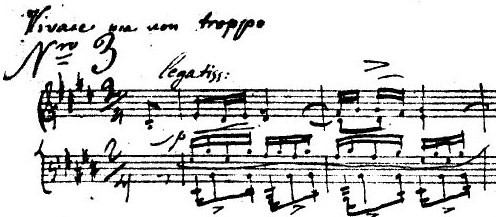
Clean copy manuscript of Chopin's Etude Op. 10 No.3 with the tempo indication Vivace ma non troppo (and legatissimo).

Polish pianist and editor Jan Ekier (1913–2014) writes in the Performance Commentary to the Polish National Edition that this étude is "always performed slower or much slower than is indicated by [Chopin's] tempo [M.M. 100]". The original autograph bears the marking Vivace changed to Vivace ma non-troppo in the clean copy for the French edition. Ekier observes: "Only in print did Chopin change it to Lento ma non-troppo simultaneously adding a metronome mark." The middle section, especially the bravura passage in sixths at the climax, is always played at a much faster tempo than the A section. An argument in favor of Chopin's fast metronome mark, according to Ekier, is the fact that the middle section "has the marking poco più animato [not in bold print], which suggests only a slight acceleration of the opening tempo". This indication is not found in the autographs, showing that Chopin originally envisioned a fast and unified tempo for the étude. Chopin disliked excessive sentiments expressed during performance, as it tore the musical structure he initially intended. Chopin also eschewed a beleaguering tempo with distinct pulse since it destroyed the significance of the 2/4 time signature.

== Technical difficulties ==
In Robert Schumann's 1836 Neue Zeitschrift für Musik article on piano études, the study is classified under the category "melody and accompaniment in one hand simultaneously". As the right hand part contains a melody (and sometimes an extra filling voice) to be played by the three "weaker fingers" and an accompaniment figure played by the first two fingers, the hand can be divided into an "active element" and an "accompanying element" not unlike in Op. 10 No. 2. French pianist Alfred Cortot (1877–1962) especially mentions the importance of "polyphonic and legato playing", the "individual tone value of the fingers" and the "intense expressiveness imparted by the weaker fingers".

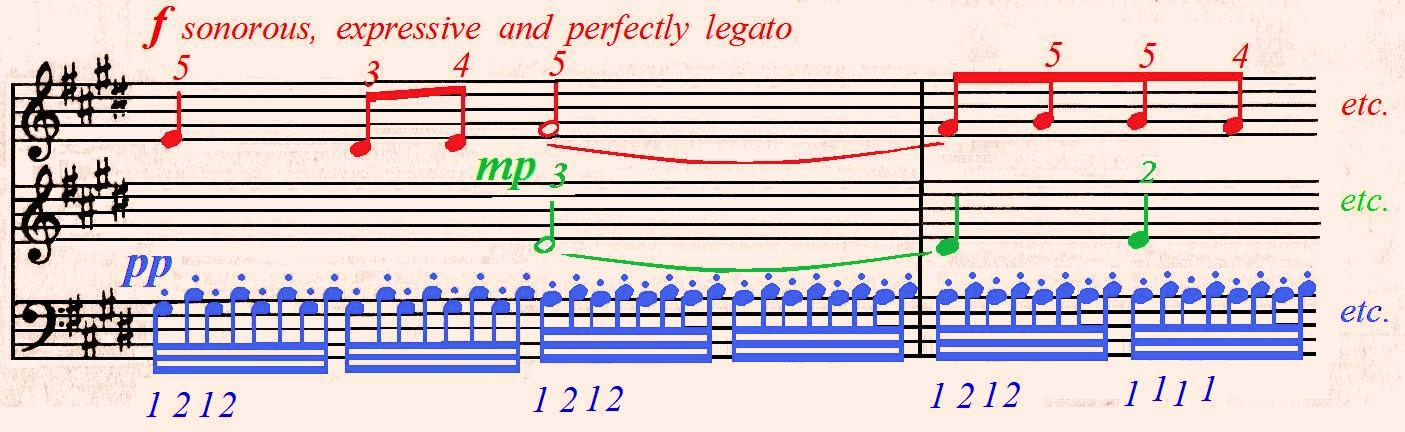
Exercise for touch differentiation in the right hand (after Cortot).

Preparatory exercises consist of addressing two "distinct muscular areas" of the hand by playing two voices with one hand, each voice with a "different intensity in tone". Cortot believes that the "weight of the hand" should lean towards the fingers playing the predominant part while the others "remain limp". He recommends practicing the right-hand part of the first twenty bars (the A section) in three distinct modes of articulation and dynamics simultaneously, the top voice forte and legato, the middle one mp, and the lowest semiquavers in pp and staccato. Concerning the legato Cortot states that the intensity of tone is imparted "by pressure and not by attack". He further observes that legato of notes played in succession by the same finger can only be achieved by the portamento device". His exercises for the double notes of the middle section stress "firm position of the hand" and "vigour of attack". In regard to the pedal Cortot recommends pedal changes synchronized with the bass line (six changes per bar), although many critics say this is too much to be necessary. No pedal indication by Chopin is found in manuscripts or original editions.

== Paraphrases and arrangements ==
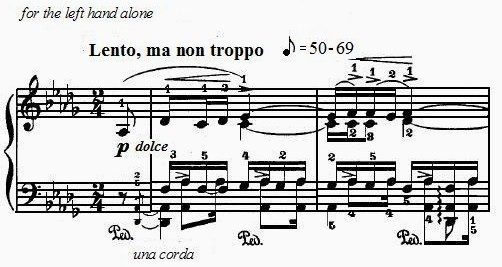
Opening of Leopold Godowsky's left-hand version of Chopin Op. 10 No. 3 (1909)

Leopold Godowsky's version for the left hand alone in his Studies on Chopin's Études is a "rather faithful transformation... creating the illusion of two-hand writing". It is transposed to D flat major.

He heard Maria Malibran sing one of these "adaptations" and pronounced himself extremely pleased. The 1950 song No Other Love is based on this piece.

== Sources ==
- Casella, Alfredo (1946). F. Chopin. Studi per pianoforte. Milan: Edizioni Curci.
- Cortot, Alfred (1915). Frédéric Chopin. 12 Études, op.10. Paris: Éditions Salabert. p. 20.
- Huneker, James (1900). "The Studies—Titanic Experiments". In Chopin: The Man and His Music. New York: Charles Scribner's Sons.
- Leichtentritt, Hugo (1922). "Die Etüden". Analyse der Chopin'schen Klavierwerke [Analysis of Chopin's Piano Works] (in German). Vol. Band II. Berlin: Max Hesses Verlag.
