= Esther Budiardjo =

Indonesian pianist

- Born: September 24, 1972; Jakarta
- Alma mater: New England Conservatory of Music
- Occupation: Pianist

Esther Budiardjo (born September 24, 1972) is an Indonesian pianist.

Esther Budiardjo was born on September 24, 1972 in Jakarta. At age fourteen, she sent an audition tape to the New England Conservatory in Boston, but due to her age they felt she should first attend The Walnut Hill School in Natick, where she graduated in 1990. At the New England Conservatory she studied under Wha Kyung Byun. Early career honors include winning first prize at the 1996 William Kapell International Piano Competition, where she performed Balakirev's Islamey, Beethoven's 33 Variations on a Waltz by Diabelli, and Chopin's E minor Concerto. She was also a finalist at the 1999 Queen Elisabeth Competition.

Her debut album was a collection of pieces by Felix Mendelssohn. In the American Record Guide, Alexander Morin wrote "Her approach is vigorous and zestful; her technique is impressive." Her rendition of Fantasia on The Last Rose of Summer from the album was one of the many recordings fraudulently released on CD under the name Joyce Hatto. Regarding her recording Leopold Godowsky's Java Suite, Harold C. Schonberg wrote in ARG, "Budiardjo is a powerful pianist who employs her superb technique with taste. She is completely on top of the music, playing with strong rhythm and assured technique."

== Discography ==
- Mendelssohn: Piano Pieces, ProPiano 224524, 1999.
  - Rondo Capriccioso
  - Last Rose of Summer;
  - Fantasy in F-sharp minor, op 28;
  - Songs Without Words, Books II+VI
  - 3 Etudes, Op. 102
  - Etude in F minor
- Godowsky:Java Suite, ProPiano 224529, 2000.
  - Java Suite by Leopold Godowsky
  - Exotique (Danse Javanaise) from Novelettes by Alexandre Tansman
  - The Gamelan of Bali from Le Tour du monde en miniature by Tansman
  - Flute in the Forest of Bandoeng from Java from Le Tour du monde en miniature by Tansman
- Moszkowski, ProPiano, 2003.
  - Hungarian Dances, Book 1 by Johannes Brahms, transcribed for solo piano by Moritz Moszkowski
  - Vingt Petites Études, Op. 91 by Moritz Moszkowski
