= Études (Chopin) =

Solo studies for piano by Frédéric Chopin

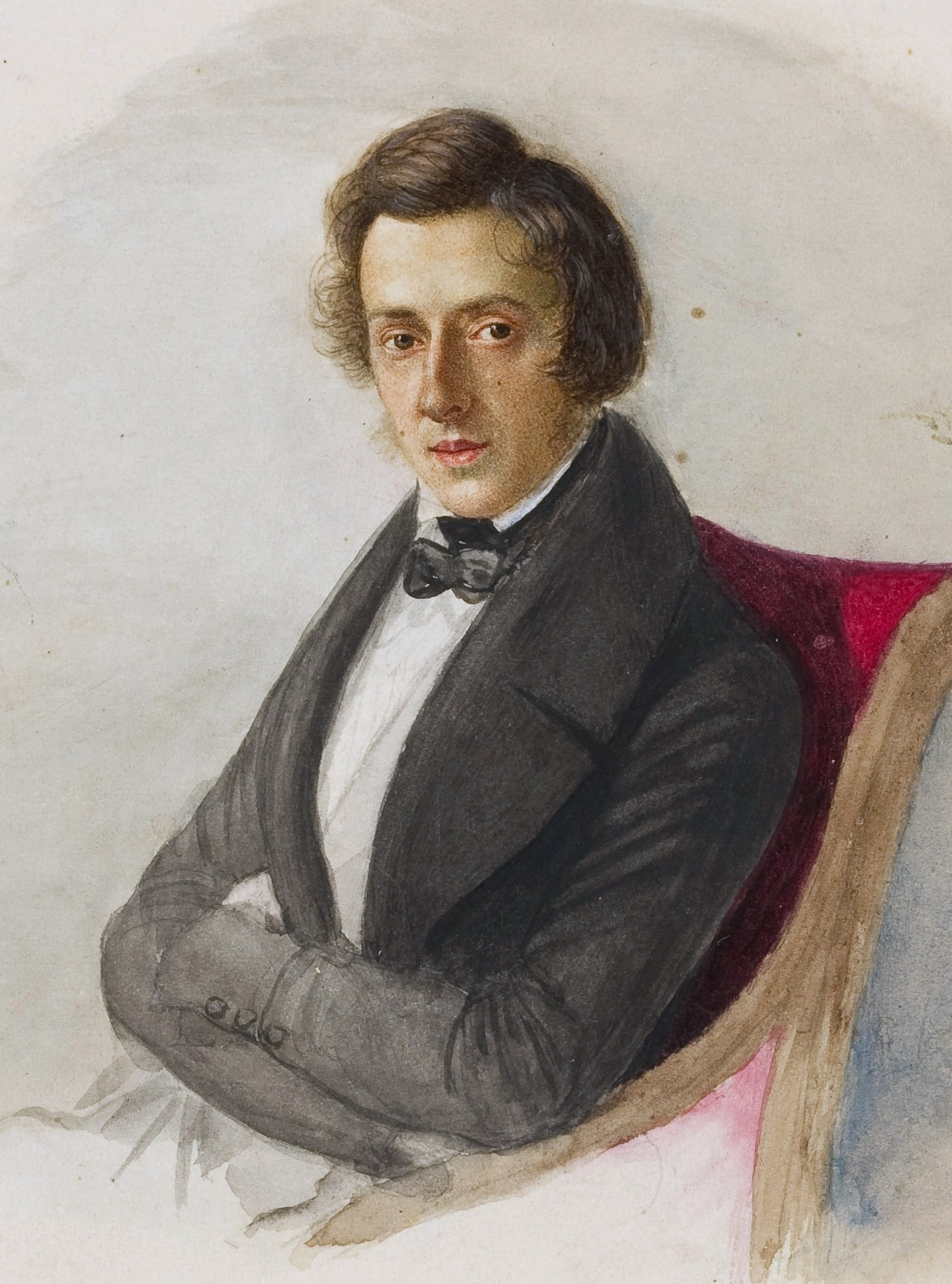
Chopin at 25, by his fiancée Maria Wodzińska, 1835

The Études by Frédéric Chopin are three sets of études (solo studies) for the piano published during the 1830s. There are 27 études overall, comprising two separate collections of 12, numbered Op. 10 and Op. 25, and a set of three without opus numbers.

== History ==
=== Composition ===
Chopin's Études formed the foundation for what was then a revolutionary playing style for the piano. They are some of the most challenging and evocative pieces in the concert piano repertoire. Because of this, they remain popular and are often performed in both concert and private stages. Some are so popular they have been given nicknames; among these are Op. 10, No. 3, sometimes called Tristesse ("Sadness") or "Farewell" (L'Adieu), the "Revolutionary" (Op. 10, No. 12), "Black Keys" (Op. 10, No. 5), and "Winter Wind" (Op. 25, No. 11). None of these nicknames are of Chopin's creation.

All 27 études were published during Chopin's lifetime; Op. 10, the first group of 12, was written between 1829 and 1832 and published in 1833, in France, Germany, and England. The 12 études of Op. 25 were composed at various times between 1832 and 1835 and published in the same countries in 1837. The final three, part of a series called Méthode des méthodes de piano compiled by Ignaz Moscheles and François-Joseph Fétis, were composed in 1839, without an assigned opus number. They appeared in Germany and France in November 1840 and in England in January 1841. Accompanying copies of these early editions are usually several manuscripts of a single étude in Chopin's hand and additional copies made by Chopin's friend Jules Fontana, along with editions by Chopin's student Karol Mikuli.

=== Impact ===
Although sets of exercises for piano had been common since the end of the 18th century (Muzio Clementi, Johann Baptist Cramer, Ignaz Moscheles, and Carl Czerny wrote the most significant ones), Chopin's études not only presented an entirely new set of technical challenges but were the first to become a regular part of the concert repertoire. They combine musical substance and technical challenge in a complete artistic form.

The études' effect on contemporaries such as Franz Liszt is apparent from the revision Liszt made to his series of concert études after meeting Chopin. Other composers after him, such as Schumann, Debussy, Prokofiev, and Rachmaninoff, wrote études influenced by Chopin's.

Polish musicologist Tadeusz A. Zieliński wrote of Op. 10, "not only did they become an orderly demonstration of a new piano style and the formulas peculiar to it, but also an artistic ennoblement of this style." Chopin's études remain well-known, and several have lodged themselves in popular music, movies, and television shows.

== List of Études ==
=== Op. 10 ===
The first set of Études was published in 1833 (although some were written as early as 1829). Chopin was 23 years old and already famous as a composer and pianist in the salons of Paris, where he made the acquaintance of Franz Liszt. Subsequently, Chopin dedicated the entire opus to him: "à mon ami Franz Liszt" ("to my friend Franz Liszt").

According to Krystyna Kobylańska, nos. 8, 9, 10, and 11 date from October/November 1829, nos. 5 and 6 probably from summer 1830, nos. 1 and 2 from November 2, 1830, no. 12 probably from September 1831, no. 7 from spring 1832, no. 4 from August 6, 1832, and no. 3 from August 25, 1832.

| Number | Key | Incipit | Audio |
|---|---|---|---|
| No. 1 | C major | | |
| No. 2 | A minor | | |
| No. 3 | E major | | |
| No. 4 | C♯ minor | | |
| No. 5 | G♭ major | | |
| No. 6 | E♭ minor | | |
| No. 7 | C major | | |
| No. 8 | F major | | |
| No. 9 | F minor | | |
| No. 10 | A♭ major | | |
| No. 11 | E♭ major | | |
| No. 12 | C minor | | |

=== Op. 25 ===
Chopin's second set of études was published in 1837 and dedicated to Franz Liszt's mistress, Marie d'Agoult, the reason for which is unknown.

All of opus 25 was written before June 30, 1835, the date of a contract between Chopin and Breitkopf & Härtel awarding the publisher the rights for Germany.

| Number | Key | Incipit | Audio |
|---|---|---|---|
| No. 1 | A♭ major | | |
| No. 2 | F minor | | |
| No. 3 | F major | | |
| No. 4 | A minor | | |
| No. 5 | E minor | | |
| No. 6 | G♯ minor | | |
| No. 7 | C♯ minor | | |
| No. 8 | D♭ major | | |
| No. 9 | G♭ major | | |
| No. 10 | B minor | | |
| No. 11 | A minor | | |
| No. 12 | C minor | | |

=== Trois nouvelles études ===
Trois nouvelles études were written in 1839 as a contribution to Méthode des méthodes de piano, a piano instruction book by Ignaz Moscheles and François-Joseph Fétis, and not given an opus number. While less technically brilliant than those of Op. 10 and 25, they nevertheless retain Chopin's original formula for harmonic and structural balance. After their initial appearance in the Moscheles–Fétis Méthode, the three études were issued separately by Maurice Schlesinger in Paris, c. 1844 (plate M.S. 4102).

| Number | Key | Incipit | Recording |
|---|---|---|---|
| No. 1 | F minor | | |
| No. 2 | A♭ major | | |
| No. 3 | D♭ major | | |

== Technical aspects and student guides ==
Chopin's études are technically demanding, requiring players to have significant skill with speed, arpeggios, and trills even in weaker fingers.

For all études

- Casella, Alfredo. F. Chopin. Studi per pianoforte. Milano: Edizioni Curci, 1946.
- Cortot, Alfred. Frédéric Chopin. 12 Études, op. 10. Édition de travail des oeuvres de Chopin. Paris: Éditions Salabert, 1915.
- Cortot, Alfred. Frédéric Chopin. 12 Études, op. 25. Édition de travail des oeuvres de Chopin. Paris: Éditions Salabert, 1915.
- Galston, Gottfried. Studienbuch [Study Book]. III. Abend [3rd Recital] (Frédéric Chopin). Berlin: Bruno Cassirer, 1910.

For selected études

- Busoni, Ferruccio. Klavierübung in zehn Büchern [Piano Tutorial in Ten Books], zweite umgestaltete und bereicherte Ausgabe. Buch 8 (Variationen und Varianten nach Chopin). Leipzig: Breitkopf & Härtel, 1925.
- Godowsky, Leopold. Studien über die Etüden von Chopin (Studies on Chopin's Etudes). New York: G. Schirmer Inc., 1899 (Berlin: Schlesinger'sche Buch- und Musikhandlung, 1903).
- Joseffy, Rafael. Etudes for the Piano. Instructive Edition. New York: G. Schirmer, 1901.

== Paraphrases ==
- Godowsky, Leopold. 53 Studies on Chopin's Études. New York: G. Schirmer Inc., 1899 (Berlin: Schlesinger'sche Buch- und Musikhandlung, 1903).
- Wührer, Friedrich. Achtzehn Studien zu Frédéric Chopins Etuden [sic] [18 Studies on Chopin's Études]. In Motu Contrario [In Contrary Motion]. Heidelberg: Willy Müller, Süddeutscher Musikverlag, 1958.

== See also ==
- Studies on Chopin's Études
- List of compositions by Frédéric Chopin
