= Étude Op. 10, No. 4 (Chopin) =

Chopin étude (1830)

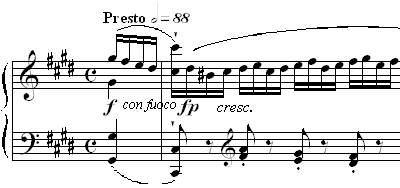
Excerpt from Étude Op. 10, No. 4

Étude Op. 10, No. 4 in C♯ minor, often referred to as "Torrent" in English, is a study for solo piano composed by Frédéric Chopin in 1830. It was first published in 1833 in France, Germany, and England as the fourth piece of his Études Op. 10. This study, a very fast Presto con fuoco, features continuous sixteenth notes (semiquavers), in perpetuum mobile fashion involving both hands.

== Structure and stylistic traits ==
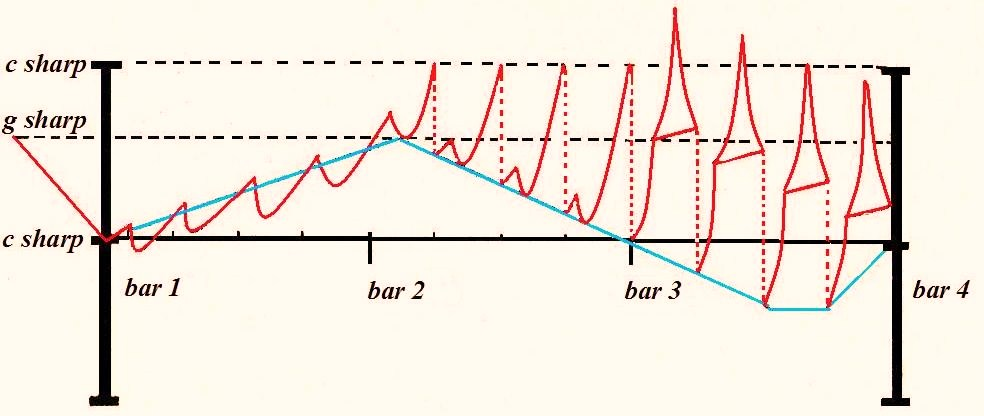
Graph of semiquaver motif, bars 1–4, after Hugo Leichtentritt

Like all of Chopin's other études, this work is in ABA form though the B section does not represent a contrasting and independent middle section in the manner of a trio. The entire piece is based on the same semiquaver motif, which springs from its opening strong sforzato accent to rapidly increase its volume and compass until ending abruptly on a strong sforzato climax. Musicologist Hugo Leichtentritt (1874–1951) presents a graphic curve which illustrates the aggressive character of the motive expanding from second to eleventh in less than three bars.

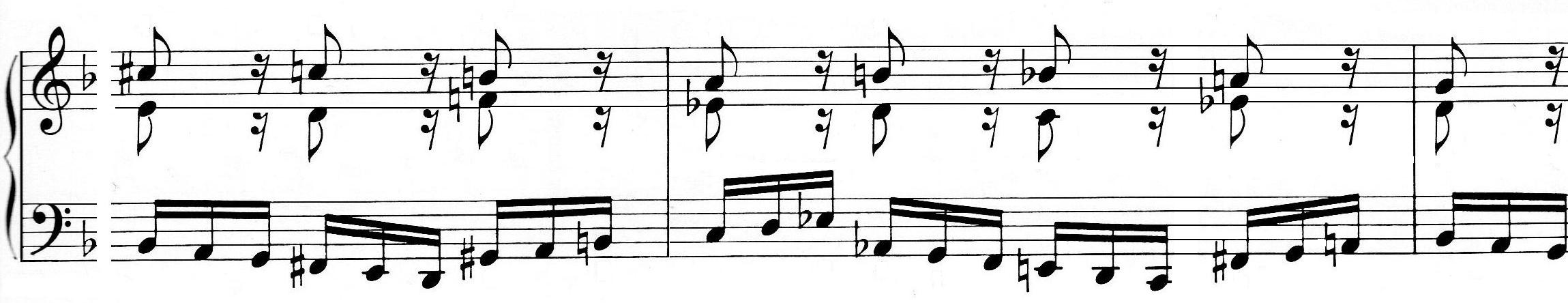
Excerpt from Johann Sebastian Bach's English Suite No. 6 (BWV 811), Gigue (bars 14–16)

Leichtentritt compares the manner in which the motif is developed, especially the 4-bar alternations of left and right hand in the rendition of the theme, to certain Bach preludes, or to the gigue of J. S. Bach's English Suite No. 6. In the B section these alternating sequences are shortened to two bars and the frequency of sforzati and accents rises.

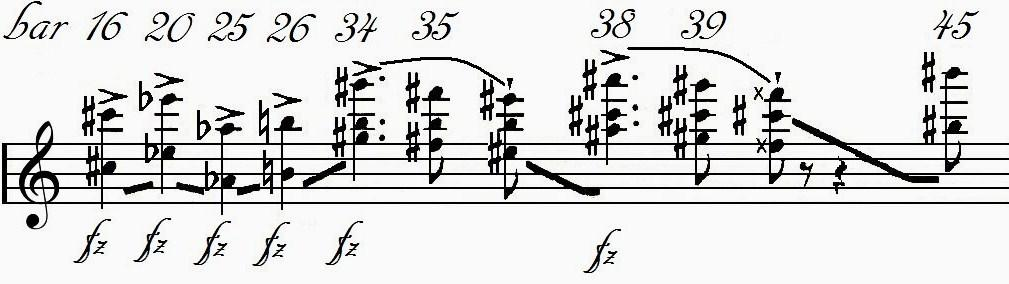
Contour line of sforzati (bars 16–45) after Leichtentritt

Leichtentritt believes that in fast tempo the sforzati climaxes in bars 16–45 can be perceived as a coherent contour line. Again, as in Op. 10, No. 1, Chopin achieves powerful sound effects with arpeggios in tenths on diminished seventh chords. After the climax, ff, con forza (45–47), a more transparent bridge leads to the return of the A section which recapitulates the first two eight-bar periods extending the cadence by four extra bars, increasing to fff and preparing the raging coda, con più fuoco possibile (as fierily as possible).

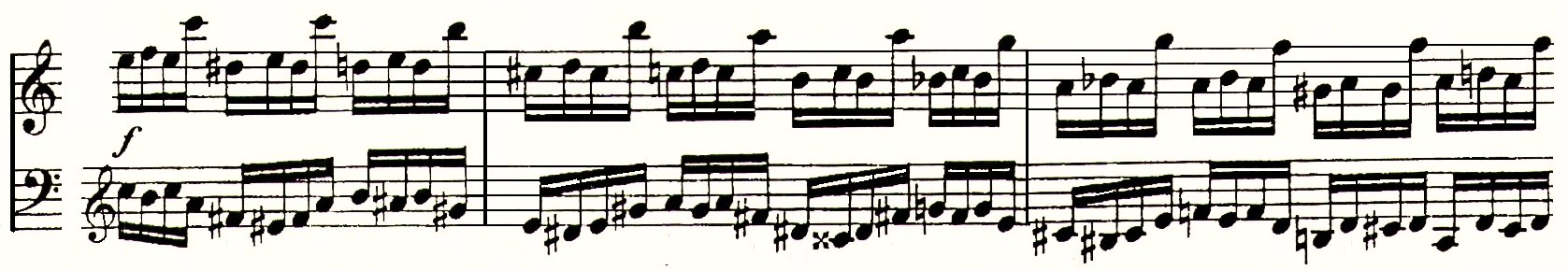
Excerpt from the Rondo of Johann Nepomuk Hummel's Piano Concerto No. 2 Op. 85 in A minor (bars 434 -436)

Chopin scholar Simon Finlow observes that a very similar passage occurs a decade before Chopin in the rondo of Johann Nepomuk Hummel's Piano Concerto No. 2, Op. 85. In Hummel, though, the purpose of the semiquaver figure is to "decorate a chromatic sequence," whereas in Chopin the figure "embodies a motivic structure that permeates the entire composition" and reaches a "dramatic apotheosis" in the Coda. Another remarkable trait is the upbeat character of the motif likewise permeating the entire piece. The étude’s perpetual motion texture and relentless semiquaver figuration, combined with its dramatic intensity, have occasionally invited comparison to the final movement (“Presto agitato”) of Beethoven’s Moonlight Sonata, which likewise employs continuous rapid figuration to generate a turbulent and climactic character. Like in the first two études of Op. 10, a rough copy autograph reads cut time (alla breve), further supported by the metronome mark = 88 referring to half notes (rather than = 176 referring to quarter notes).

== Character ==
American music critic James Huneker (1857–1921) believes that "despite its dark key color", this étude "bubbles with life and spurts flame." German pianist and composer Theodor Kullak (1818–1882) calls it a "bravura study for velocity and lightness in both hands. Accentuation fiery!" Leichtentritt calls the piece a "magnificent tone-painting" [prachtvolles Tongemälde] and "elemental sound experience" [elementares Klangerlebnis]:

[...] The expression of a restless fierce, almost savage, grim raging: The image of tossed up ocean waves breaking on a rocky coast, thundering and foaming, their spray splashing upwards, licking the rocks and quickly flowing down again. [...] the fascinating interplay of rushing, roaring, murmuring, rumbling, flowing, climbing, jumping, crashing, falling, all this without a single point of rest. [...] Bar 27: The playing waves seem to rest shortly on a projecting rock terrace and run for a short while in the plain (30–33), they fall step by step, suddenly drowned out by a new thunderous rush (33), which in its precipitous downfall dissolves into colored foam (35, 36). [...] Bars 41 - 44: A surging up and down with both hands; high up sends a wave its splash (44) and in mighty thunderous crash (ff con fuoco) the wave collapses on itself, running out on level plain (47–50), but always, even in ebbing, revealing its power through occasional sforzato chords of the left hand.

Chopin scholar Robert Collet believes that the study "has more than a hint of something elemental, demoniacal and even sinister." Italian composer and editor Alfredo Casella (1883–1947) states: "The piece should be finished with extreme impetuosity and without any relaxing, almost like a body hurled with great velocity [suddenly dashing] against an unexpected obstacle."

== Technical difficulties ==
In Robert Schumann's 1836 Neue Zeitschrift für Musik article on piano études, the study is classified under the category "speed and lightness" [Schnelligkeit und Leichtigkeit]. Collet remarks that the procedure of transferring the semiquaver figuration from one hand to the other, common in Bach but rare in Chopin, "makes great demands on the left hand." Chopin [in other works] rarely treats the left hand "as if it were a second right hand." Chopin's zigzag configuration of the semiquaver line hardly allows usage of the standard C♯ minor scale fingering and invites pianists to use their thumb on black keys, treating them just like white ones. The result is a general absence of finger crossings, thus facilitating a quicker tempo. French pianist Alfred Cortot (1877–1962) states that the main difficulty to overcome is "regularity and briskness of attack" and the [very quick] alternation of narrow and wide hand positions. His preliminary exercises commence to address the narrow and wide positions separately.

Many editions cite pedaling, but none appears in the original editions, except at the last four bars (79–82).

== Arrangements ==
Leopold Godowsky's version for the left hand alone in his 53 Studies on Chopin's Études "retains most elements of the model," but presents a challenge to the performer who tries to "retain the full emotional impact of the original."
