= Java Suite =

1925 suite for solo piano by Leopold Godowsky

- Suite by Leopold Godowsky
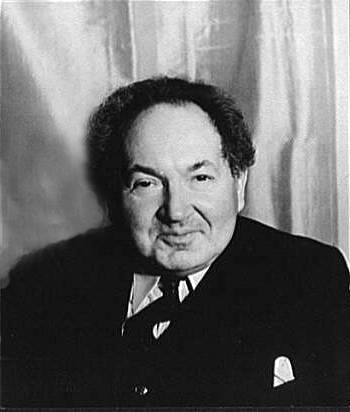
- Godowsky (1935; by Carl Van Vechten)
- Composed: 1924–25
- Published: 1925
- Movements: twelve
- Scoring: piano

The Java Suite (originally published as Phonoramas. Tonal journeys for the pianoforte) is a suite for solo piano by Leopold Godowsky, composed between 1924 and 1925. It consists of twelve movements and is influenced by the gamelan music of Java, Indonesia (then the Dutch East Indies), extensively utilizing pentatonic harmonies throughout.

== Historical background ==
Godowsky remarked in the work's preface:

"Having travelled extensively in many lands, some near and familiar, others remote and strange, it occurred to me that a musical portrayal of some of the interesting things I had been privileged to see, a tonal description of the impressions and emotions they had awakened, would interest those who are attracted by adventure and picturesqueness and inspired by their poetic reactions.

Who is not at heart a globe-trotter? Are we not all fascinated by distant countries and strange people? And so the thought gradually matured in me to recreate my roaming experiences. This cycle of musical travelogues-tonal journeys-which i have name collectively "Phonoramas", begins with a series of twelve descriptive scenes in java."

== Structure ==
The suite consists of twelve movements, divided into four parts. Godowsky composed the work under the influence of gamelan music after a visit to Java. A typical performance of the work lasts approximately 50 minutes. The first complete recording of the entire Suite was made in 2000 by Esther Budiardjo, on Pro Piano Records CD PPR224529. Since then, it’s been recorded by Konstantin Scherbakov (Marco Polo) and Carl Petersson (Sterling Records). The Gardens of Buitenzorg is recorded by several other pianists like Marc-André Hamelin and is the only piece that get recorded regularly.

Although the Java suite is published as a whole, it wasn’t meant to be performed in its entirety. The suite is divided into four equal parts, each containing three pieces whose tonal schemes correlate, creating a unified whole. Furthermore, each book is structured in the same manner: each book starts with a character piece, followed by a slow movement and ending with a brilliant showstopper.

The first book starts in A minor. The second piece too, continues in A minor, though it ends on an E major-chord, creating an imperfect cadence which resolves into the third and final piece.

The tonal schemes of the first piece of the second book mirrors in the third piece. Both have a ternary structure, but the first one is in C major with a middle section in E major while the third piece is in E major with a middle section in C major. The middle piece is in E minor, a tonality both close to C major and E major.

The third book starts with three dances, which misleadingly gets counted as a whole. The first dance is in G♯ minor, the second in B major and the last in A♭ major. Remarkable is the last measure of the third dance, which also opens the following piece. This is the only instance of some kind of cyclic use in the suite.

The fourth and last book starts with the gamelan in C♯ minor. It clearly bears resemblance with the first piece of the first book, although this one feels freer and more elaborate. The following two pieces are both in A major. The middle section of the last piece echoes the first piece of this book. The suite ends bombastically in A major, the relative major of the first piece, thus creating a sense of unity yet again.

== Descriptions ==
Godowsky added detailed descriptions of each of the scenes, elaborately describing what each of them is inspired by.

=== Part One ===
==== 1. Gamelan (A minor) ====
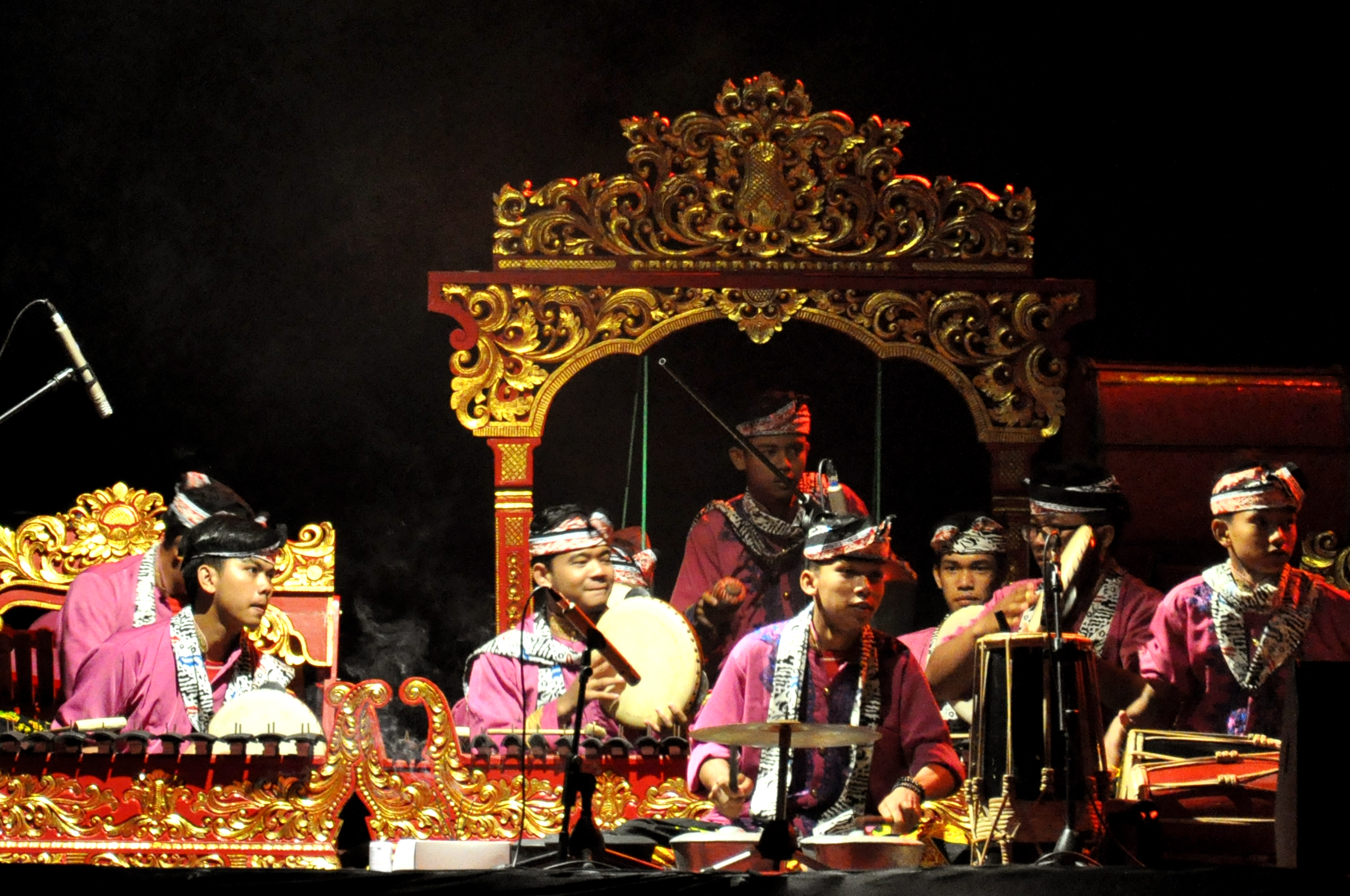
Gamelan performance at Borobudur International Performances and Art Festival 2018

Native music, played by the Javanese on their indigenous instruments, is called Gamelan. The Javanese ensemble is a kind of exotic orchestra, con- sisting mainly of diversely shaped and constructed percussive instruments of metal, wood and bamboo, comprising various kinds and sizes of bells, chimes, gongs, sounding boards, bowls, pans, drums. (some barrel-like), tom - toms, native xylophones, sonorous alang-alang (zephyr-like, aeolian harp- like) and other unique music implements. The only stringed instrument I could discern was the ancient, guitar-shaped reéaé, which is held by the leader in a position similar to that of the lute.

Both rulers of the two Sultanates of central Java: the Susuhunan of Solo and the Sultan of Djokja, and the two independent princes, Manku Negoro of Solo and Paku Alam of Djokja, have the best, largest and most complete native orchestras (Gumelan). They own old instruments of inestimable value, the enchanting sonority of which is attributable to the mellowing process of time.

The sonority of the Gamelan is so weird, spectral, fantastic and bewitching, the native music so elusive, vague, shimmering and singular, that on listening to this new world of sound I lost my sense of reality, imagining myself in a realm of enchantment. Nothing seen or experienced in Java conveyed so strongly the mysterious and strange character of the island and its inhabitants.

The Gamelan produces most ethereal pianissimos, particularly entrancing when heard from a distance. It is like a perfume of sound, like a musical breeze. Usually the music, beginning very softly and languidly, becomes faster and louder as the movement progresses, rising, at last, to a barbaric climax.

In this, the first of the descriptive scenes, I have endeavored to recreate a Gamelan sonority~ a typically Javanese atmosphere. Except for the one chromatic variation(pages 9–10), which is intentionally Occidental, the movement is almost exclusively diatonic and decidedly Oriental (Far Eastern).

==== 2. Wayang-Purwa, Puppet Shadow Plays (A minor) ====
‘This ancient, characteristically Javanese quasi -histrionic entertainment, produced on festive occasions, is very popular in Java. It symbolises to the Javanese their past historical greatness; their hopes, aspirations and national solidarity. To the subdued accompaniment of the Gamelan, the Dalang, manager, actor, musician, singer, reciter and improvisator, all in one,-recites classic Hindu epics, or modernized and localized versions of them, or other mythical or historical tales and East Indian legends, while grotesque, flat leather puppets throw shadows on a white screen to interpret and illustrate the reciter’s stories. These puppets the Dalang manipulates by means of bamboo rods. Wayang-Purwa is somewhat of a combination of Punch and Judy and Chinese shadows.

==== 3. Hari Besaar, The Great Day (A minor → C major) ====
The Kermess - the Country Fair - is here.

Residents from surrounding rural areas travel to the town to participate in local festivals and recreational activities.

Actors, musicians, dancers and fakirs contribute to the pleasures of the people and to the picturesqueness of the scene.

The Great Day - Hari Besaar!

=== Part Two ===
==== 4. Chattering Monkeys at the Sacred Lake of Wendit (C major → E major → C major) ====
The Sacred Lake of Wendit is several miles distant from the attractive little city of Malang. In the woods, near the Take, we find our - selves in one of the numerous Simian colonies of Java, among the ab. origines of the forest, enjoying an intimale view of their tribal. life. On every side are jabbering ‘monkeys, hundreds of them, jumping from tree to tree, running up and down the trunks and branches, while others; nearer the ground, are springing on and off the roofs of the small hotel and the bath houses, snatching bananas from the visitors.

The scene is full of humor, fun and animation.

==== 5. Boro Budur in Moonlight (E minor) ====
On a sacred hill, in the heart of Java, some thirty miles from Djokja, stand the colossal ruins of the most imposing and gi - gantic Buddhist monument in existence, the world-famous temple of Borobudur, “The Shrine of the Many Buddhas.” No matter how blasé the weary traveler may be, he cannot fail to be stirred and bewildered by the stupendous masonry and by the hundreds of sculptured Buddhas, images and bas-reliefs. The amazing dimensions and incredible craftsmanship enrapture the senses; the loftiness of conception, the luxuriance of imagination thrill the beholder.

In moonlight, Boro Budur is most fantastic. “An uncanny, eerie, melancholy mood permeates the whole almosphere.Deep silence and a sense of strangeness and out-of-the-worldness contribute to the impression of utter desolation and to the feeling of inevitable decay ‘and dissolution of all things earthly, the hopeless struggle of human endeavor against eternity.”

==== 6. The Bromo Volcano and the Sand Sea at Daybreak (E major → C major → E major) ====
Reaching the Sand Sea from Tosari, the most famous mountain resort in Java, we crossed the sea of sand, perhaps the vast- est amphitheatre in the world, arriving at the Bromo crater at dawn.

A marvelous sunrise enhanced the terrifying hugeness and transcendental grandeur of this awe-inspiring panorama. The boiling, roaring, rumbling subterranean forces, seething and spouting up from abysmal depths, the sulphurous vapors and. dense clouds, spreading steadily and menacingly over the horizon, suggested scenes from Dante's Inferno, and brought to realization the fact that cataclysmic activities, everlasting fires in the bowels of the earth, threaten all that is alive.

The appalling thought of the frailty of all human institutions was overwhelming. Cui Bono?.......

But the bright sun, shedding its glorious light and: dispelling all fear and gloom, changed the feeling of a- crushing futility into an ecstatic triumphal ode. The mere consciousness that such elemental powers exist, alleviates the pain of living. An overpowering feeling of humility, of compassion and tenderness toward all things. alive, a passionate adoration for the unknown source of all consciousness, filled the soul.

And then we returned........

=== Part Three ===
==== 7. Three Dances (Dance 1: G♯ minor; Dance 2: B major; Dance 3: A♭ major) ====
It is doubtful if there is a people in any part of the world whose innermost feelings are so wholly revealed in their dances as are the Javanese.

And whether religious or secular, warlike or peaceful, spiritual or sensuous, these dances are always beautiful.

The first of the “Three Dances” expresses the languor and melancholy of the Far East; the second, the grace and charm of the Oriental dancers; the third, their poetry and tenderness, translated into an Occidental idiom.

==== 8. The Gardens of Buitenzorg (A♭ major) ====
Buitenzorg, meaning “Sans Souci” and pronounced Boy-ten-sorg, forty miles from Batavia, is the country capital of Java, where the Governor-general of the Dutch East Indies has his residence. His spacious palace is situated in a large park which forms part of the most famous Botanical Gardens in the world.

The finest collection of tropical trees, plants and flowers is to be found in the gardens ofthis distant corner of our Earth. The profusion, richness, magnificence and beauty of this strange horticultural world are unparalleled.

The fragrant frangipanis, the white tuberoses(the Malay call them “The Charmers of the Night”) and a bewildering number of other most delicately scented flowers intoxicate the senses.

The heavily perfumed air awakens an inexpressibly deep and painful yearning for unknown worlds, for inaccessible ideals, for past happenings irrevocably gone—these memories which the ocean of time gradually submerges and finally buries in oblivion......

Why do certain scents produce unutterable regrets, insatiable longings, indefinable desires?

==== 9. In the Streets of Old Batavia (D♭ major → C major → D♭ major) ====
‘To stroll in the old streets of lower Batavia is an exhilarating experience. As we wander near the seashore, through the crowded bazaars and busy, narrow streets, many of which are intersected by bricked canals lined with weather-beaten buildings in the Dutch style, we meet exotic crowds, consisting mainly of Chinese, Arabs, natives and other Asiatics, interspersed with Europeans, of whom the Dutch form a large majority.

A ramble through the hectic Chinese quarter leads us to a quiet and contemplative corner of the Arab settlement. Another turn brings us to the native quarter. And when the bazaars are reached, a kaleidoscopic, multifarious conglomeration of humans bewilders even the most seasoned globe-trotter.

=== Part Four ===
==== 10. In the Kraton (C♯ minor) ====
Surakarta, popularly called Solo, and Djokjakarta, commonly shortened to Djokja, are the most important and interesting native cities in Java. .

The greatest ruler— The Susuhunan — resides in Solo, while the next in importance, the Sultan of Djokja, lives in the last named capital. In the heart of each capital is a vast enclosure called the Kraton, in which the potentate has his palaces and wherein dwell besides the Sultan, Sultana and princes and princesses, his numerous concubines, slaves and servants, court officials, nobles, musi-cians, actors, dancers, workmen, tradespeople and many individuals with indefinable occupations. Each Kraton has a population of between ten and fifteen thousand, the ensemble constituting a court of huge dimensions.

It is evening. Quaint scenes charm our vision. Faint sounds of the entrancing Gamelan fill the fragrant air. The seemingly unreal reality casts a hypnotic spell over our consciousness.

There is poetry in every ebbing moment.

It is evening in the Orient.......

==== 11. The Ruined Water Castle at Djokja (A major) ====
Near the Kraton of Djokja, deserted, fallen into decay, stand the mouldy and crumbling remains of the once resplendent Water Palace, with its murmuring fountains and splashing cascades, with its aquatic pranks and air-filling scents of exotic flowers. Where once was merriment, there is now the mystery and romance of vanished days, the sadness of evanescent pleasures, The fountains and cascades murmur memories of yesteryears - yearning for past joys, mourning for departed love....

==== 12. A Court Pageant in Solo (A major → F♯ minor → A major) ====
The pomp, bombast and gorgeousness of a royal procession on a festive occasion or court function in either of the two native capitals make a dazzling and grotesque spectacle. The exuberance and abandon of the natives, the force and charm of the native rhythms, challenge description.

The clanging and clashing march opens the event. Strongly emphasized in the middle section (F♯ minor) of this closing composition, is that strain of sadness ever present in the music of the Orient. The hilarious mood is resumed with the Fugato, which leads back to an intensified version of the barbaric march.

And here these tonal journeys come to an end.
