= Osip Lerner =

Osip Mikhailovich Lerner (13 January 1847 – 23 January 1907), also known as Y. Y. (Yosef Yehuda) Lerner, was a 19th-century Russian Jewish intellectual, writer, and critic. Originally a maskil—a propagator of the Haskala, or "Jewish Enlightenment"—he became a pioneer in the fields of Yiddish theater and folklore, as well as literary criticism. In his later years, he converted to Christianity and wrote a book denouncing Jews (Adler, 1999, p. 200).

== Biography ==
Lerner was born in Berdichev (today Berdychiv), Kiev Governorate, then in the Russian Empire. After attending the Jewish school there, at age 13 he went to study at the gymnasium in nearby Zhytomyr. In 1866 he moved to Odessa, where for one year he attended lectures in the law faculty of the recently founded Odessa University, and thereafter began to devote himself entirely to literary pursuits (Reyzen, 1927, col. 269).

In 1881, shortly after the assassination of Tsar Alexander II, Lerner leased the Mariinsky Theater in Odessa, Kherson Governorate (then part of Imperial Russia) to present Yiddish theater. He first presented plays by N.M. Sheikevitch and Moshe Leib Lilienblum, then was the first to present classic European theater in Yiddish, translating the material but not radically altering it or adding songs. He was the first to present Yiddish-language productions of Karl Gutzkow's Uriel Acosta and Eugène Scribe's La Juive. Jacob Adler, in his memoir, remarks that "both were works on Jewish subjects and both were in the repertoire of every important European stage of the time" (Adler, 1999, p. 200).

His daughter, Tina Lerner, became a noted pianist.
