= Passacaglia (Godowsky) =

- by Leopold Godowsky
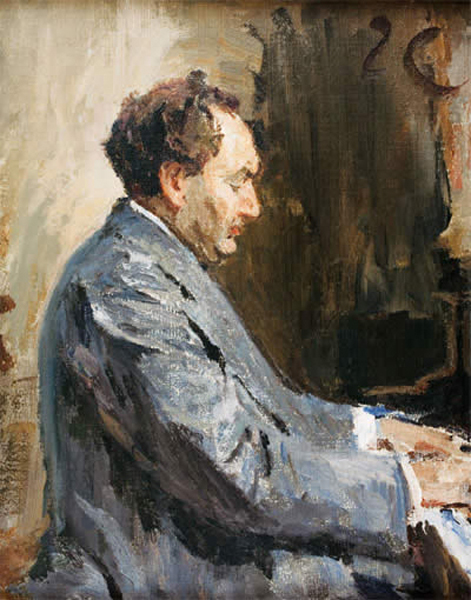
- Portrait of the composer at the piano by Polish painter Jan Ciągliński (1911)
- Key: B minor
- Occasion: One-hundredth anniversary of Franz Schubert's death
- Based on: Schubert's Unfinished Symphony
- Composed: 1927
- Published: 1928
- Publisher: Carl Fischer Music

Passacaglia is a solo piano composition by the composer Leopold Godowsky. It was completed in New York, on October 21, 1927. The composition commemorates the one hundredth anniversary of the death of Franz Schubert. Typical of Godowsky's composition style, the piece contains dense contrapuntal, polyphonic, and chromatic writing.

== Dedication ==
Godowsky remarked in the work's preface:

"This composition, written on the eve of the hundredth anniversary of Franz Schubert's death, is my heartfelt tribute to this precious and prolific genius, who, despite his short and uneventful life, succeeded so admirably in translating our innermost emotions into music.

With the exception of Chopin, I know of no other composer whose lyricism have touched the heart of so many; whose melodies have become so thoroughly the treasured property of all civilized nations; whose tone-imageries have so sensitized and refined our poetic susceptibilities.

I will feel fully rewarded, should this contribution to the approaching commemoration prove to be worthy of the occasion."

== Description ==
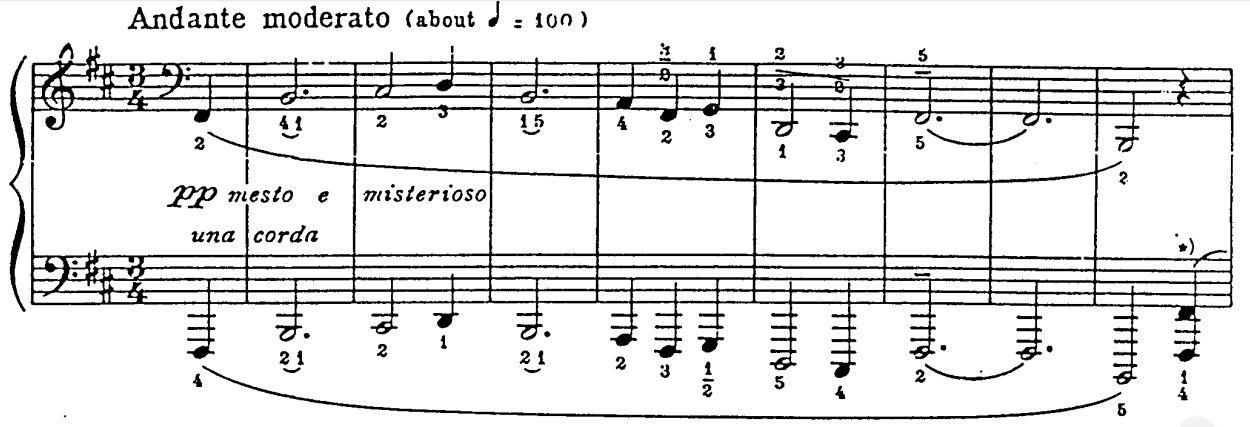
The opening bars of the passacaglia

The work is a passacaglia based on the first 8 measures of Schubert's Unfinished Symphony. The theme is stated exactly, but with an F# added at the start which aids in transition between the variations. There are forty-four variations, followed by an epilogue, a cadenza, and then closing with a four-part fugue, following the pattern established for this form by the likes of Bach (Passacaglia and Fugue in C minor, BWV 582) and Brahms (Variations and Fugue on a Theme by Handel). The writing makes stylistic references to Brahms himself (variations 31-35, 38 & 39), as well as Chopin (variations 9 & 27), Rachmaninoff (variations 19, 20 & 24), and others (Scarlatti, Ravel, and Richard Strauss). In variation 39 there is an obvious reference to Schubert's Erlkönig. Schubert's Fantaisie in F minor (var.42) and the famous string ostinato that follows the opening of the original symphony (end of fugue) are quoted as well.

== Reception ==
The Passacaglia gained notoriety after pianist Vladimir Horowitz reportedly gave up on the piece, claiming that six hands were required to play it. Abram Chasins, who heard Godowsky perform this piece in one of his gatherings, remarked, "This was sheer enchantment, both the work itself and Godowsky's pianism. It had the cool, colorful clarity of a stained-glass window. Although I was greatly moved and impressed by what I heard, Godowsky's effortless mastery made me unaware of the vastness of his pianistic feat that night."

== Publication ==
The Passacaglia was published in 1928 by Carl Fischer Music, and is available within The Godowsky Collection, Vol. 1: Original Compositions for Piano Solo. In 2024, the work passed into the United States public domain.
