= Studies on Chopin's Études =

Arrangements of Chopin's études by Leopold Godowsky

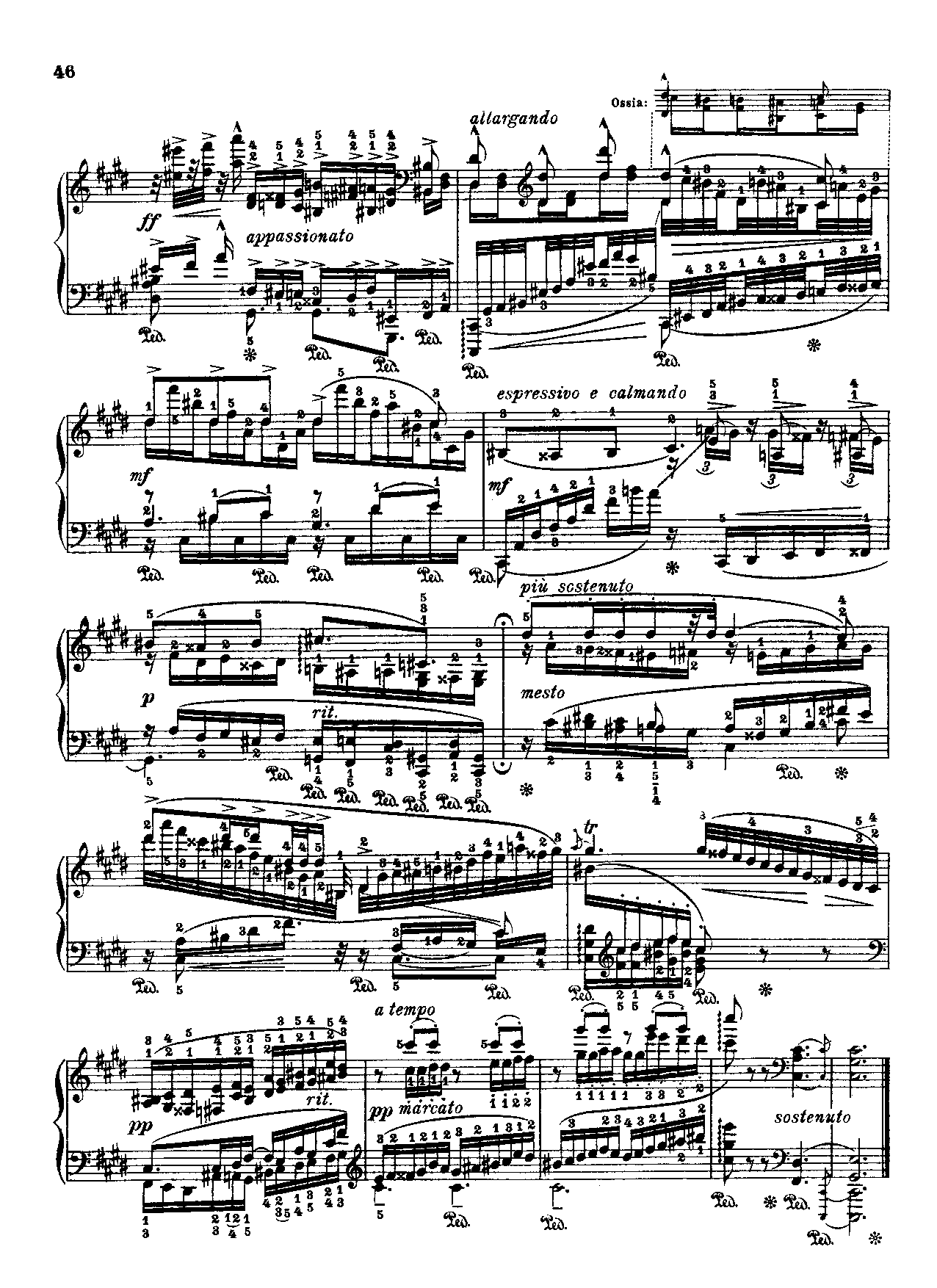
A page from Godowsky's first study on Chopin's étude Opus 10 No. 9.

The Studies on Chopin's Études are a set of 53 arrangements of Chopin's études by Leopold Godowsky, composed between 1894 and 1914. They are renowned for their technical difficulty: critic Harold C. Schonberg called them "the most impossibly difficult things ever written for the piano." Several of the studies (for example, the study "Ignis Fatuus" on Chopin's Étude in A minor, Op. 10, No. 2) put the original right-hand part into the left hand; several others are for the left hand alone (for example, the study on the "Revolutionary" Étude, transposed to C♯ minor). Two of the studies even combine two études; the better known of these, called "Badinage," combines both the G♭ (the "Black Key" Étude of Op. 10 and the "Butterfly" étude of Op. 25).

== The studies ==
The number of studies is often given as 54, with Op. 25, No. 2 having one study written as a considerably different ossia of another; a similar ossia also exists for one of the studies on Op. 25, No. 3, so the total number of studies can be taken to be 55. In contrast, Godowsky's original numbering scheme runs only to 48.

=== Opus 10 ===
Opus 10 No. 1

Study of Chopin Etude Op. 10, No. 1
MIDI rendition by Bernd Krüger

- 1st Study in C major
- 2nd Study in D♭ major (left hand only)

Opus 10 No. 2

- 1st Study in A minor (left hand only)
- 2nd Study in A minor ("Ignis Fatuus")

Opus 10 No. 3

- Study in D♭ major (left hand only)

Opus 10 No. 4

- Study in C♯ minor (left hand only)

Opus 10 No. 5

- 1st Study in G♭ major
- 2nd Study in C major
- 3rd Study in A minor ("Tarantella")
- 4th Study in A major ("Capriccio")
- 5th Study in G♭ major
- 6th Study in G♭ major
- 7th Study in G♭ major (left hand only)
- This étude was also combined with the Opus 25 No. 9 étude in the "Badinage" composition.

Opus 10 No. 6

- Study in E♭ minor (left hand only)

Opus 10 No. 7

- 1st Study in C major ("Toccata")
- 2nd Study in G♭ major ("Nocturne")
- 3rd Study in E♭ major (left hand only)

Opus 10 No. 8

- 1st Study in F major
- 2nd Study in G♭ major (left hand only)

Opus 10 No. 9

- 1st Study in C♯ minor
- 2nd Study in F minor (imitation of Opus 25 No. 2)
- 3rd Study in F♯ minor (left hand only)

Opus 10 No. 10

- 1st Study in D major
- 2nd Study in A♭ major (left hand only)

Opus 10 No. 11

- Study in A major (left hand only)
- This étude was also combined with the Opus 25 No. 3 étude.

Opus 10 No. 12

- Study in C♯ minor (left hand only)

=== Opus 25 ===
Opus 25 No. 1

- 1st Study in A♭ major (left hand only)
- 2nd Study in A♭ major (Like a piece for four hands)
- 3rd Study in A♭ major

Opus 25 No. 2

- 1st Study in F minor
- 2nd Study in F minor ("Waltz")
- 3rd Study (A) in F minor
- 3rd Study (B) in F minor
- 4th Study in F♯ minor (left hand only)
- This étude was also imitated in one of the Opus 10 No. 9 studies.

Opus 25 No. 3

- 1st Study in F major
- 2nd Study in F major (left hand only)
- This étude was also combined with the Opus 10 No. 11 étude

Opus 25 No. 4

- 1st Study in A minor (left hand only)
- 2nd Study in F minor ("Polonaise")

Opus 25 No. 5

- 1st Study in E minor
- 2nd Study in C♯ minor ("Mazurka")
- 3rd Study in B♭ minor (left hand only)

Opus 25 No. 6

- Study in G♯ minor

Opus 25 No. 7

There are no studies of this étude in the collection.

Opus 25 No. 8

- Study in D♭ major

Opus 25 No. 9

- 1st Study in G♭ major
- 2nd Study in G♭ major (left hand only)
- This étude was also combined with the Opus 10 No. 5 étude in the "Badinage" composition.

Opus 25 No. 10

- Study in B minor (left hand only)

Opus 25 No. 11

- Study in A minor

Opus 25 No. 12

- Study in C♯ minor (left hand only)

=== Trois Nouvelles Études ===
Nouvelle Étude No. 1

- Study in F minor (left hand only)

Nouvelle Étude No. 2

- 1st Study in E major
- 2nd Study in D♭ major (left hand only)

Nouvelle Étude No. 3

- Study in G major ("Menuetto")

== Omitted and unfinished studies ==
An additional number of studies have been documented, but all got omitted from the final list, three of them had been found, fragmented and incomplete. Due to these changes and the discovery of the unfinished studies, it is believed that there are over a dozen studies that were composed but not published. Godowsky told Grover Ackley Brower, an assistant editor at Carl Fischer, that there were 12 to 15 unpublished Studies. Godowsky's secretary, John George Hinderer, wrote that Godowsky had ten manuscripts left in Vienna at the outbreak of World War I. Examining the studies that were included in the 1903 and 1909 lists that were ultimately removed from the final collection, the following studies were either completed, unfinished or conceptualized:

=== Omitted studies ===
Opus 10 No. 2

- 3rd Study in A minor (Listed as "No.5") [documented in 1903 and 1909 lists, but omitted in 1914; not issued]

Opus 10 No. 5

- 8th Study in G♭ major (No. 12c. Black keys study for both hands with the subtitle of "Chinoiserie (Chinese style)".) [Title added in 1909, but never issued]
- 9th Study in G♭ major (No. 12d. White key study for both hands.) [Title added in 1909, but never issued]

Opus 10 No. 11

- 2nd Study in E♭ (No designation of major or minor was mentioned.) [Although it is not on the list of 1903 and 1909, Hinderer mentioned the existence of this study. A different study from the current Study No. 21]

Opus 25 No. 6

- 2nd Study in G♯ minor (No. 36. It is written as "Inversion" and is a different study from the current No. 36. Hinderer describes "in thirds (inverted) for left hand (also for the right hand) not alone, in either case".) [listed in first series, but not published]

Opus 25 No. 7

- Study in C♯ minor or F♯ minor (Listed in the 1903 list as "No. 37" in C♯ minor, and in the 1909 list as "No. 37" in F♯ minor. In the latter, it is noted to be for the left hand only. Hinderer wrote "an Elegie for left hand alone".) [listed in first series, but not published]

Opus 25 No. 8

- 2nd Study in D♭ major (No. 39. In 1903, it was written "In thirds", in 1909 it was written "In thirds and octaves" in German, and "In thirds" in English and French. A study different from the current No. 39. According to Hinderer, there are two versions, one for the left hand alone and one for the right hand (not alone, presumably).) [listed in first series, but not published]

Opus 25 No. 10

- Study (Marcia funebre) [Early list specifies Study No.41 as "Marcia funebre," but the version published is an Allegro con fuoco]

Opus 25 No. 12

- Study in C♯ minor (Listed as "No. 43" in the 1903 list. It was a different study from the current No. 43 (solo for the left hand), and Hinderer wrote that it was a study for both hands.)

Study (No. 49)

Op. 25 No. 4 and Op. 25 No. 11 combined (Listed as "No. 49" in the 1903 and 1909 lists. Hinderer also mentions its existence.) [listed in early series, but not published]

=== Unfinished studies ===
Opus 25 No. 3

2nd Study (No. 30a) in D♯ minor ("Marsch (March)")

Nouvelle Étude No. 1

Study (No. 44a) in F minor (Variational form, completed by Marc-André Hamelin)

Study in A minor (No. 50)

Op. 10 No. 2, Op. 25 No. 4 and Op. 25 No. 11 (Combined in one study)

Recordings

A few recordings exist of the March and Study 50. Marc-André Hamelin has a recording of his own version of Study 44a.

== Editions ==
The studies were published in the early 20th century by Schlesinger, now Robert Lienau Musikverlag, a subsidiary of Schott Music Group. They are currently available in five volumes.

- Volume 1, Nos. 1–12a. Product number RL16940, ISMN 979-0-011-16940-7
- Volume 1, Nos. 13–20. Product number RL16950, ISMN 979-0-011-16950-6
- Volume 1, Nos. 21–30. Product number RL16960, ISMN 979-0-011-16960-5
- Volume 1, Nos. 31–40. Product number RL16970, ISMN 979-0-011-16970-4
- Volume 1, Nos. 41–48. Product number RL16980, ISMN 979-0-011-16980-3

They are published in the United States by Carl Fischer Music.

== Recordings ==
Only four pianists, Geoffrey Douglas Madge, Carlo Grante, Marc-André Hamelin, and Emanuele Delucchi have recorded the entire set of the studies. Francesco Libetta (1994, 1995, 2018), Carlo Grante (1995) and Emanuele Delucchi (2018) have performed the complete set in concert, but only Libetta has done so from memory (for example, in Miami on July 7, 2018, over two recitals). Emanuele Delucchi performed the complete set in one afternoon in Cagliari on September 19, 2024. Ivan Ilić has made a speciality of the 22 études for the left hand alone.

Only a few other pianists have ventured to record selected studies. The first was Vladimir de Pachmann, who recorded the Study on Op. 10, No. 12 in 1912. Others include Boris Berezovsky, Michel Beroff, Jorge Bolet, Robert Goldsand, Ian Hobson, Ivan Ilić, David Saperton, Victor Schiøler, Jacob Jettomersky, and David Stanhope.
