= Alice Frisca =

American pianist (1900–1960)

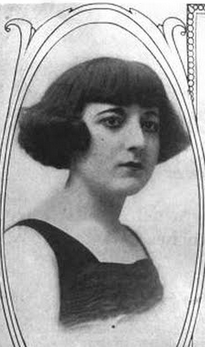
- Alice Frisca, from a 1921 publication.

Background information
- Born: Alice Mayer; March 7, 1900; San Francisco, California, U.S.
- Died: January 24, 1960 (aged 59) Puerto Rico
- Occupation: Pianist
- Years active: 1920s
- Spouse: Ralph Kirsch (m. 1922)

Alice Frisca, born Alice Mayer (March 7, 1900 – January 24, 1960), was an American pianist.

== Early life ==
Alice Mayer was born in San Francisco, the daughter of Benjamin Mayer and Eva Mayer. Her stage name was a reference to the city of her birth. In 1920, she won the MacDowell Prize from the California Federation of Music Clubs. She was a student of Pierre Douillet, Clarence Eddy, and Leopold Godowsky.

== Career ==
She made her Paris debut in 1920, and was awarded a medal for a concert she gave in 1921 in Paris, a benefit for French and Belgian artists in need after World War I. "She has a conspicuously neat and fluent technique," noted critic Alfred Kalisch, writing in The Musical Times of her London debut in 1921, "and a touch of no little charm." Her New York debut a few months later drew similar critical appreciation, though the New-York Tribune said that "Miss Frisca evidently mistakes force for brilliance," and said that she "more nearly resembled a noisy amateur than a professional pianist."

== Personal life ==
Alice Frisca married businessman Ralph Kirsch in San Francisco on December 28, 1922; she subsequently retired from her performing career. Her husband's nephew, Harold C. Schonberg, was the Pulitzer Prize-winning chief music critic at The New York Times from 1960 to 1980; he cited her as his first piano teacher and an important early influence on his understanding of music. Alice Mayer Kirsch died of a heart attack in 1960 while accompanying her husband on a trip to Puerto Rico.
