= Tina Lerner =

Russian-American concert pianist (1889 – post-1947)

Tina Lerner Тина Лернер
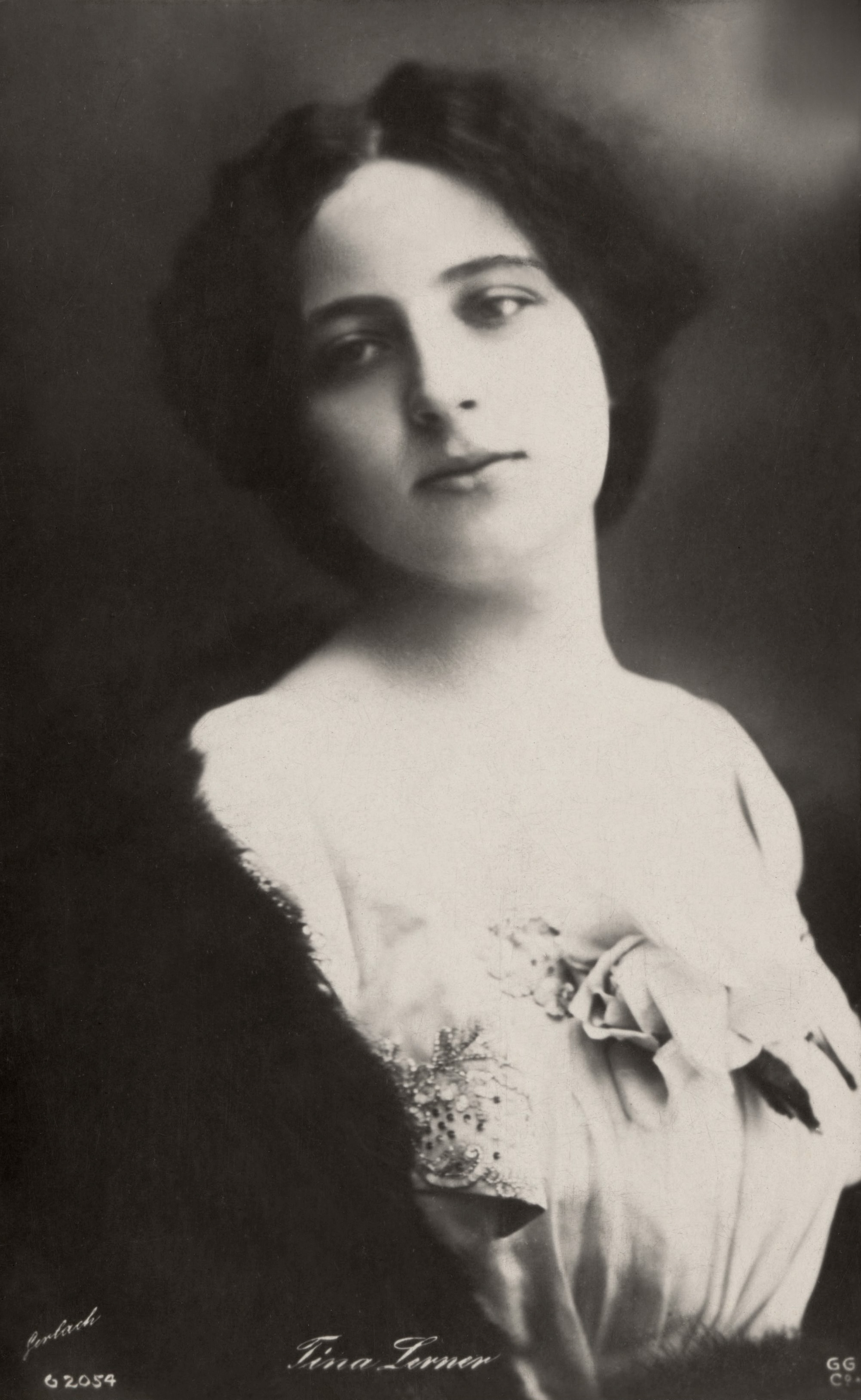
- Tina Lerner, c. 1908 (Photo Martin Gerlach)

Background information
- Born: Valentina Osipovna Lerner; June 5, 1889; Odessa
- Died: February 26, 1973 (aged 83)
- Genres: Classical
- Occupation: Musician
- Instrument: Piano
- Spouse: Luis Bachner (m. 1909; div. 1915) Vladimir Shavitch (m. 1915; died 1947)
- Resting place: Cimitero monumentale della Misericordia dell'Antella, Italy
- Children: 1
- Father: Osip Lerner

Tina Lerner (June 5, 1889 – February 26, 1973; in Cyrillic, Тина Лернер) was a Russian-American concert pianist born in Odessa.

== Early life ==
Valentina Osipovna Lerner was the daughter of Yiddish writers Osip Mikhailovich Lerner and Mariam Rabinovitch. She showed musical promise from an early age, in her birthplace, Odessa. She studied at Moscow Conservatory and with Leopold Godowsky, and began performing while still a teenager.

== Career ==
Lerner performed in Germany and England before she toured North America in 1908 and 1909, performing with orchestras in major cities, starting in New York with a concert at Carnegie Hall.

She returned to perform in London in 1912, before embarking on her third American tour (1912–1913). "An audience that represented the wealth and culture of San Francisco went into ecstasies of delight over her remarkable playing of the Tschaikowski Concerto," according to the San Francisco Orchestra's manager, Frank W. Healy. Her fifth American tour commenced in 1917. She toured in South America in 1922.

In 1917, she was one of the first pianists to give a concert over a radio telephone, when she played aboard a steamship in the Pacific Ocean in a concert that was transmitted to other steamships between San Francisco and Honolulu, on the occasion of George Washington's birthday.

Her performances of works by Chopin and Tchaikovsky were captured on piano rolls. She lived in Syracuse, New York in the 1920s, and taught piano master classes at Syracuse University. Shavitch and Lerner gave a concert together at the Hollywood Bowl in 1927.

== Personal life ==
Tina Lerner married twice, both times to musicians. She married Luis Bachner in 1909 and divorced him in 1915. She married conductor Vladimir Shavitch in 1915, a few days after her first marriage was officially ended. The Shavitches had a daughter, Dollina, born in 1916.

Tina Lerner was widowed when Vladimir Shavitch died in 1947; she was living in Florence, Italy, with their daughter by then. Tina Lerner's grave is in the Cimitero Monumentale della Misericordia at Antella, near Florence.
