= Triakontameron =

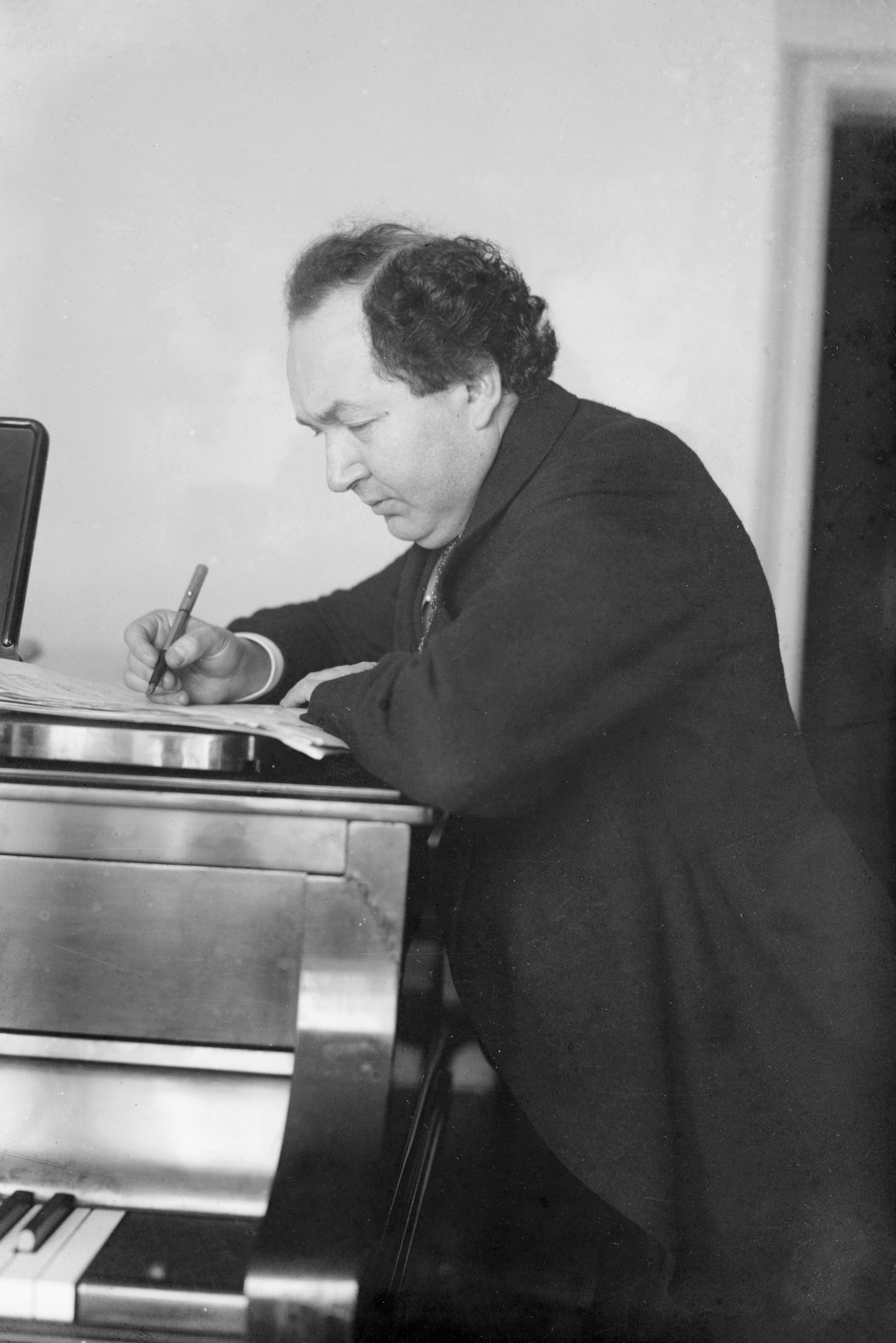
Leopold Godowsky in 1915

Triakontameron is a suite of 30 pieces in six volumes for piano composed from 1919 to 1920 by Leopold Godowsky; each was written in a single day, and all are written in three-four time. The entire suite took Godowsky over five months (7 August 1919, Seattle - 20 January 1920, Chicago) to complete, with twenty being composed in Seattle, and the rest being composed intermittently between Los Angeles, New York, and the final piece in Chicago. The pieces were not presented in order of composition.

The title was inspired by that of Boccaccio's Decameron. The work was written in a period of ten days, with the concept of the suite being a ten-day journey where ten people tell 100 stories. Among the best-known excerpts of the suite are Alt-Wien, Nocturnal Tangier, and Ethiopian Serenade.

== Music ==
- Volume I
  1. Nocturnal Tangier (Seattle, 25 August 1919)
  2. Sylvan Tyrol (Seattle, 7 August 1919)
  3. Paradoxical Moods (Seattle, 10 August 1919)
  4. Rendezvous (New York, 5 February 1920)
  5. Twilight Phantasms (Seattle, 12 August 1919)
- Volume II
  6. The Pleading Troubadour (Seattle, 23 August 1919)
  7. Yesteryear (Los Angeles, 13 October 1919)
  8. A Watteau Paysage (Seattle, 10 August 1919)
  9. Enchanted Glen (New York, 8 January 1920)
  10. Resignation (New York, 14 January 1920)
- Volume III
  11. Alt-Wien (Subtitled "Whose Yesterdays look backwards with a Smile through Tears") (Seattle, 8 August 1919) [also arranged for 2 pianos]
  12. Ethiopian Serenade (Seattle, 22 August 1919)
  13. Terpsichorean Vindobona (Seattle, 14 August 1919)
  14. Whitecaps (Seattle, 24 August 1919)
  15. The Temptress (Seattle, 11 August 1919)
- Volume IV
  16. An Old Ballade (Seattle, 16 August 1919)
  17. An American Idyll (Seattle, 27 August 1919)
  18. Anachronisms (Seattle, 3 September 1919)
  19. A Little Tango Rag (Seattle, 26 August 1919)
  20. Whirling Dervishes (Los Angeles, 16 October 1919)
- Volume V
  21. The Salon (Los Angeles, 27 October 1919)
  22. An Epic (Chicago, 20 January 1920)
  23. The Music-Box (Seattle, 31 August 1919)
  24. Lullaby (Seattle, 17 August 1919)
  25. Memories (Los Angeles, 18 October 1919)
- Volume VI
  26. The Cuckoo Clock (Seattle, 28 August 1919)
  27. Lament (Seattle, 19 August 1919)
  28. Quixotic Errantry (Seattle, 18 August 1919)
  29. Poëme Macabre (Los Angeles, 21 October 1919)
  30. Requiem (1914/1918): Epilogue (Los Angeles, 24 October 1919)

== Further Sources ==
- Ewen, David (1959). Encyclopedia of Concert Music. New York: Hill and Wang.
- Gornaya, I. N.; Kapustina, T. N. (June 26, 2023). "On the Genre Nature of Leopold Godowsky's Piano Cycle "Triacontameron"". Musical Journal of Northern Europe. 2 (10): 1–22.
- Saxe, L. A. (1957). "The Published Music of Leopold Godowsky". Notes. 14 (2). Music Library Association: 165–183. doi:10.2307/891677. JSTOR 891677.
