= Étude Op. 25, No. 3 (Chopin) =

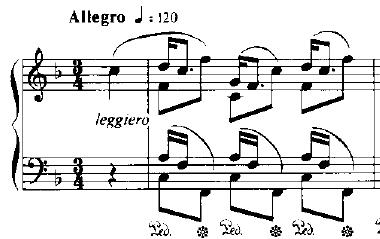
Excerpt from the beginning of the Étude Op. 25 No. 3

Étude Op. 25, No. 3, in F major, is a technical study composed by Frédéric Chopin in 1836. The romanticized nickname of this piece (not given by Chopin, who thought that idea was repulsive) is "The Horseman" or "The Knight", probably because of its "galloping" style. It is mostly a study in rhythm. The study has four different voices that must be brought out by the performer. The technical figure consists of lateral movements of the hand that must be played with flourish and refinement.
