= Konstantin Scherbakov =

Russian pianist (born 1963)

Konstantin Scherbakov (born 11 June 1963) is a Russian-Swiss classical pianist known for his performances of virtuoso repertoire and his extensive discography, particularly for the labels Naxos and Marco Polo. He gained wider recognition after winning the All-Union Piano Competition dedicated to the 110th anniversary of Sergei Rachmaninoff's birth in Moscow in 1983.

Scherbakov is noted for championing technically demanding piano repertoire, including the complete works of Leopold Godowsky and Franz Liszt's piano transcriptions of Ludwig van Beethoven's symphonies. Since 1998 he has served as professor of piano at the Zurich University of the Arts.

== Early life and education ==
Scherbakov was born in Barnaul in Siberia. He made his debut with the philharmonic orchestra of his native town at the age of eleven, performing Beethoven's Piano Concerto No. 1.

He went on to study at the Moscow Tchaikovsky Conservatory under Professor Lev Naumov for seven years, later serving as his assistant for a further three. During his early career he won prizes at international competitions in Montreal, Bolzano (Busoni), Zurich (Géza Anda) and Rome.

== Career ==
=== International performances ===
Following his 1983 competition win, Scherbakov performed extensively across the Soviet Union. In 1990 he presented four solo recitals of the complete piano works of Sergei Rachmaninoff at the Chamber Music Festival of Asolo in Italy, appearances that launched his international touring career and led to festival invitations including Schubertiade Feldkirch, the Klavier-Festival Ruhr and the Lucerne Festival.

Scherbakov has since performed as a soloist with more than seventy orchestras and has appeared under conductors including Christian Thielemann, Yuri Simonov, Rudolf Barshai, Kirill Petrenko, Aldo Ceccato and Nello Santi.

=== Recording career ===
Scherbakov's first commercial recording, Lyapunov's Twelve Transcendental Études, was released on Marco Polo in 1994 at the invitation of Naxos founder Klaus Heymann, launching a recording career that has since spanned more than sixty albums, mostly for Naxos and Marco Polo, with further releases on Steinway & Sons, TwoPianists and EMI Classics.

Major recording projects have included Liszt's transcriptions of Beethoven's nine symphonies, the complete solo piano works of Dmitri Shostakovich, and the complete piano works of Leopold Godowsky. His recordings have drawn critical praise; ''Gramophone'' magazine described his playing as marked by delicacy and affection, and the German Record Critics' Circle has twice awarded him its top prize. His 2000 recording of Shostakovich's 24 Preludes and Fugues won the Cannes Classical Award at MIDEM in 2001.

== Repertoire ==
Scherbakov's repertoire is particularly associated with virtuosic works of the late Romantic and early twentieth century, including those of Leopold Godowsky, Sergei Lyapunov and Franz Liszt.

He has performed complete concert cycles of large-scale projects, including the complete solo piano works of Rachmaninoff, alongside Beethoven's sonatas and Liszt's transcriptions of Beethoven's symphonies.

== Teaching ==
In 1998 Scherbakov joined the faculty of the Zurich University of the Arts as professor of piano. He regularly gives master classes internationally and serves as a juror at major competitions, including the ARD International Music Competition in Munich, the Ferruccio Busoni International Piano Competition in Bolzano, the Franz Liszt International Piano Competition in Weimar, and competitions in Rio de Janeiro and Seoul.

== Personal life ==
Scherbakov has lived in Zurich, Switzerland with his family since 1992, and also spends time in Palamós on the Catalan coast of Spain.

== Awards and honours ==
- First Prize, All-Union Piano Competition dedicated to the 110th anniversary of Sergei Rachmaninoff's birth, Moscow (1983).
- Cannes Classical Award (MIDEM), for Shostakovich's 24 Preludes and Fugues (2001).
- Preis der Deutschen Schallplattenkritik.

== Selected discography ==
- Shostakovich: 24 Preludes and Fugues.
- Liszt: Beethoven: The Nine Symphonies.
- Tchaikovsky: Complete Piano Concertos.
- Godowsky: Complete Piano Works.
- Beethoven: Complete Piano Sonatas.
- Lyapunov: Transcendental Études.
