= Harold C. Schonberg =

American music critic and author (1915–2003)

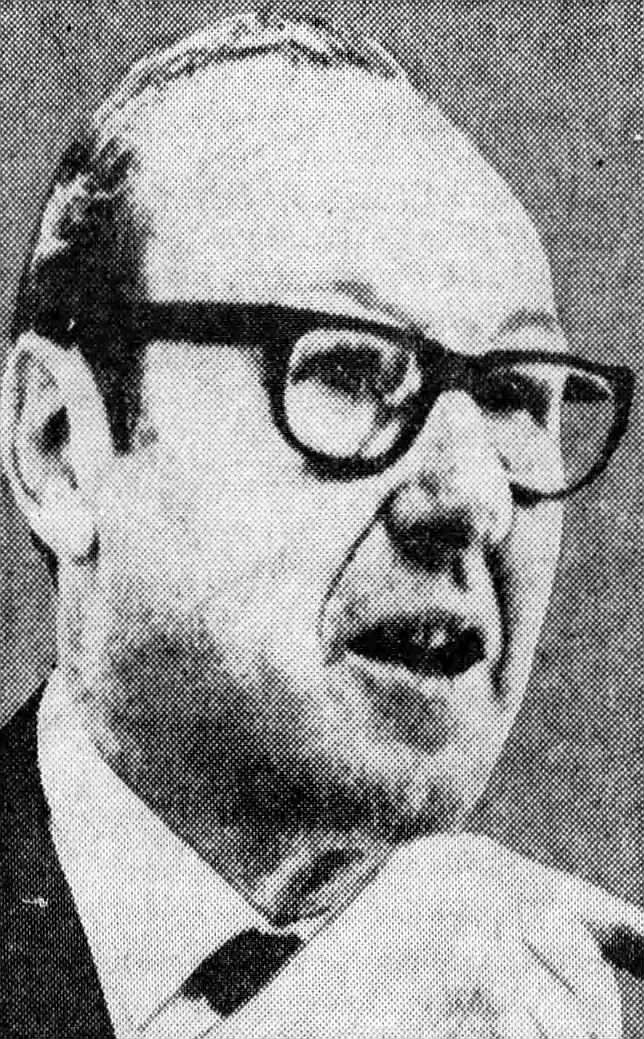
Schonberg, c. 1971

Harold Charles Schonberg (November 29, 1915 – July 26, 2003) was an American music critic and author. He is best known for his contributions to The New York Times, where he was chief music critic from 1960 to 1980. In 1971, he became the first music critic to win the Pulitzer Prize for Criticism.

An influential critic, he is noted for his "crisp, often staccato style that gave his evaluations unequivocal clarity and directness", and his encouragement of Romantic music and of pianists like Sviatoslav Richter. He wrote several books, notably The Lives of the Great Composers. He also reviewed crime fiction under the alias Newgate Callendar and covered chess. A collection of his columns was published as Facing the Music.

== Life and career ==
=== Early life ===
Harold Charles Schonberg was born in Washington Heights, Manhattan in New York City, New York on 29 November 1915. His parents were David and Minnie (née Kirsch) Schonberg, and he had a brother (Stanley) and a sister (Edith). His aunt Alice Frisca was a former concert pianist and had studied with Leopold Godowsky. He started piano lessons with Frisca at four years old, and "discovered early on that he had a superb musical memory that allowed him to remember pieces in great detail after a single hearing".

Schonberg cited the first performance he saw at the Metropolitan Opera around age 12 as particularly formative. He recalled the performance, of Richard Wagner's Die Meistersinger von Nürnberg, 39 years later in a piece characteristically written in the third person:

The boy remembers being awed by the auditorium. So big! So beautiful! So much what his dreams had told him it would be! He vaguely remembers other impressions. But the thing as fresh in his mind today as it was on Nov. 25, 1927, was the sound of that first C major chord when Artur Bodanzky brought down his baton...The chord rose to the dress circle, and he felt as though he could reach out, touch it, caress it. He had been to concerts before, but somehow, in this vast dark auditorium, there was a different feeling to the texture and even the organization of this chord.

Schonberg received a Bachelor of Arts at Brooklyn College (1937), during which he published his first music criticism in the Musical Advance journal. He then studied as a graduate student at New York University, receiving a Master of Arts in 1938 while studying under the composer Marion Bauer. His dissertation was Elizabethan Song Books: A Study of Their Musical and Literary Significance. He recalled: "The English department did not know how to deal with the musical elements of the thesis, and the music department did not know how to deal with the literary side. An A plus was virtually assured in advance."

In his early life, Schonberg was also interested in the visual arts, studying drawing at the Art Students League of New York and sometimes illustrating his music criticism with caricatures of the musicians they featured. In 1939, Schonberg received his first post as a music critic: he was associate editor and critic at the American Music Lover. (Note: The American Music Lover later became the American Record Guide, the name which it is better known by.)

During World War II, Schonberg was a first lieutenant in the United States Army Airborne Signal Corps. He had hoped to enlist as a pilot, but was declared pastel-blind (he could distinguish colors but not shadings and subtleties) and was sent to London, where he was a code breaker and later a parachutist. He broke his leg on a training jump before D-Day and could not participate in the Normandy landings; every member of his platoon who jumped into France was ultimately killed. He remained in the Army until 1946.

=== At The New York Times ===
Schonberg joined The New York Times in 1950. He rose to the post of senior music critic for the Times a decade later. In this capacity he published daily reviews and longer features on operas and classical music on Sundays. He also worked effectively behind the scenes to increase music coverage in the Times and develop its first-rate music staff. Upon his retirement as senior music critic in 1980, he became cultural correspondent for the Times.

Schonberg also wrote articles for Harper's and High Fidelity magazine, among others.

Explaining his critical style, Schonberg said

I write for myself—not necessarily for readers, not for musicians. I’d be dead if I tried to please a particular audience. Criticism is only informed opinion. I write a piece that is a personal reaction based, hopefully, on a lot of years of study, background, scholarship and whatever intuition I have. It’s not a critic’s job to be right or wrong; it’s his job to express an opinion in readable English.

Samuel Lipman wrote "He also has a common touch, speaking familiarly and often using homely colloquial expressions (concerning Beethoven’s victory in improvisation over the virtuoso pianist Steibelt, to cite a telling example, he writes that the immortal composer 'played him under the table')."

Piano music was a specialty of Schonberg. Lipman writes "Pianists and composers for the piano are undoubtedly the closest to his heart. About them he writes with the attitude of a baseball nut who knows all the statistics." His favorite pianist was Josef Hofmann: "Those who heard his piano playing can never forget the man's aristocracy, flowing line, sensuous sound, brilliant technique and, above all, feeling of spontaneity."

Aside from his contributions to music journalism, he published 13 books, most of them on music, including The Great Pianists: From Mozart to the Present (1963, revised 1987) and The Lives of the Great Composers (1970; revised 1981, 1997) which traced the lives of major composers from Monteverdi to modern times. Kirkus wrote of Schonberg's sketches: "the majority are uncommonly revealing -- even to the mention of Bach's miserliness in a not infrequent interjection of humor." He sometimes wrote in the form of imagined conversations with an alter ego, in the "Dear Ossip" reviews. A collection of his columns was published as Facing the Music.

==== Criticisms of Bernstein ====
Schonberg was highly critical of Leonard Bernstein during the composer-conductor's eleven-year tenure (1958–69) as principal conductor of the New York Philharmonic. He accused Bernstein of showing off by using exaggerated gestures on the podium and of conducting a piece in a way that made its structure overly obvious to audiences (e.g., slowing down during the transition from one main theme to another).

One of Schonberg's best remembered criticisms of Bernstein was written after the 6 April 1962, performance before which Bernstein announced that he disagreed with pianist Glenn Gould's interpretation of Brahms' Piano Concerto No. 1 but was going to conduct it anyway because he found it fascinating. Schonberg chided Bernstein in print, suggesting that he should have either refrained from publicizing his disagreement, backed out of the concert, or imposed his own will on Gould.

After Bernstein's regular tenure at the New York Philharmonic ended, however, Schonberg seemed to mellow in his attitude toward him and actually began to praise his conducting, stating in his book The Glorious Ones that "with age, came less of a need to prove something", and that "there were moments of glory in his conceptions."

=== Other interests ===
A self-described "chess player, kibitzer and on-again, off-again chess correspondent for The New York Times", Schonberg covered the 1972 World Chess Championship match between Boris Spassky and Bobby Fischer in Reykjavík and the 1984 championship match between Garry Kasparov and Anatoly Karpov in Moscow. For the former game, Lothar Schmid praised Schonberg's coverage as the most thorough of any journalist. He covered the game's giants, from François-André Danican Philidor to Fischer, in Grandmasters of Chess. He wrote that he had "lost to some of the game's greatest players."

He also reviewed mysteries and thrillers for The New York Times under the pseudonym Newgate Callender from 1972 to 1995.

Schonberg was an avid golfer, though a poor one by his own estimation. He co-authored How To Play Double Bogey Golf (1975) with Hollis Alpert, founder of the National Society of Film Critics, and fellow author Ira Mothner. Schonberg, Mothner and Alpert frequently played golf together.

=== Later life and death ===
In 1985, Schonberg was critic-in-residence at McMaster University in Hamilton, Canada.

In 1987, it was announced that Schonberg was assisting Vladimir Horowitz in the preparation of the pianist's memoirs. Although the project was never completed, Schonberg's biography Horowitz: His Life and Music was published in 1992.

Also in 1987, he served on the jury of the Paloma O'Shea Santander International Piano Competition. Late in life, he judged a young artist's competition in Rochester, New York, that gave first prize to the 12-year-old violinist Joshua Bell.

Schonberg died in New York City on 26 July 2003, at the age of 87, of an unspecified cause. In his obituary notice in The New York Times the next day, Allan Kozinn wrote that Schonberg "set the standard for critical evaluation and journalistic thoroughness."

== Legacy ==
The University of Maryland Libraries have a Harold C. Schonberg collection in their International Piano Archives at Maryland; it contains a substantial collection of correspondences between Schonberg and fellow critics, musicians and readers.

Late in his career, he wrote "The years have gone very fast, and I can only say with old Robert Burton: When I go musing all alone, Thinking of divers things fore- known, When I build castles in the air, Void of sorrow and void of fear, Pleasing myself with phantasms sweet, Methinks the time runs very fleet."

David Patrick Stearns writes

Schonberg loved music, not as common an attribute among critics as one might think. Even in recent years, as his eyesight was faltering, he could be seen struggling to read the letters of Berlioz with a magnifying glass, while commuting by bus between Manhattan and his weekend home on Long Island. To disagree with him was to achieve a better understanding of music. Inevitably, casual conversations turned to his favourite topic, pianists, and even when he damned one of your favourites, his reasoned clarity left you with a more crystallised idea of why you loved what he did not.

He said he enjoyed arguments with readers, “so long as what I’ve written makes you think”.

== Selected publications ==
=== Books ===
- Schonberg, Harold C. (1955). Chamber and Solo Instrument Music. Guide to Long-Playing Records. New York: Alfred A. Knopf.
- —— (1959). The Collector's Chopin and Schumann. Keystone Books in Music. J. B. Lippincott.
- —— (1965). The Great Pianists. London: Victor Gollancz.
  - —— (1987). The Great Pianists (Rev. and updated ed.). New York: Simon & Schuster. ISBN 9780671638375. OCLC 15196909.
- —— (1972). Grandmasters of Chess. Philadelphia and New York: J. B. Lippincott. ISBN 9784871875677. OCLC 951569212.
- —— (1981). The Great Conductors. New York: Summit Books. ISBN 9780671254063. OCLC 614438015.
- —— (1981). Facing the Music. New York: Summit Books. ISBN 9780671254063. OCLC 7204970. OL 4255142M.
- —— (1997). The Lives of the Great Composers (Third ed.). New York: W.W. Norton. ISBN 9780393038576. OCLC 34356892. OL 3259514W.
- —— (1985). The Glorious Ones: Classical Music's Legendary Performers. New York: Times Books. ISBN 9780812911893. OCLC 11598959. OL 3259509W.
- —— (1992). Horowitz: his life and music. New York: Simon & Schuster. ISBN 9780671712198. OCLC 26130513.
