= Marc-André Hamelin =

Canadian pianist and composer

Marc-André Hamelin OC OQ
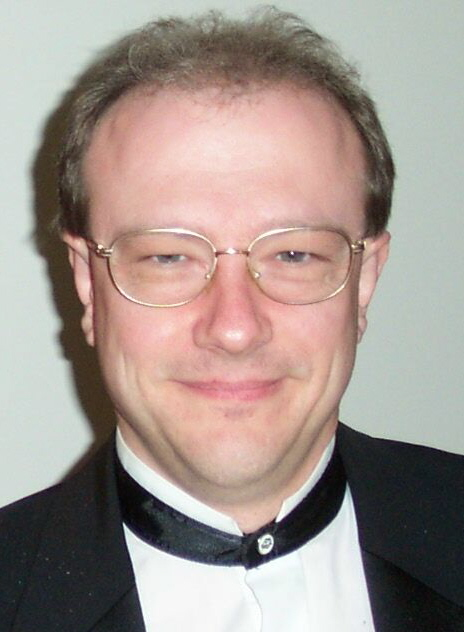
- Hamelin in 2008
- Born: September 5, 1961 (age 65); Montreal, Quebec, Canada
- Occupations: Pianist and composer

Marc-André Hamelin, OC, OQ (born September 5, 1961) is a Canadian virtuoso pianist and composer who has received 11 Grammy Award nominations. He is on the faculty of the New England Conservatory of Music.

== Biography ==
=== Education ===
Born in Montreal, Quebec, Hamelin began his piano studies at the age of five. His father, a pharmacist who was also an amateur pianist, introduced him to the works of Charles-Valentin Alkan, Leopold Godowsky and Kaikhosru Shapurji Sorabji when he was still young. He studied at the École de musique Vincent-d'Indy in Montreal with Yvonne Hubert and then at Temple University in Philadelphia with Harvey Wedeen. In 1989, he received the Virginia Parker Prize.

=== Performances and recordings ===
Hamelin has given recitals in many cities. His festival appearances have included Bad Kissingen, Belfast, Cervantino, La Grange de Meslay, Husum Piano Rarities, Lanaudière, Ravinia, La Roque d’Anthéron, Ruhr Piano, Halifax (Nova Scotia), Singapore Piano, Snape Maltings Proms, Mänttä Music Festival, Turku and Ottawa Strings of the Future, as well as the Chopin Festivals of Bagatelle (Paris), Duszniki and Valldemossa.

He appears regularly in both the Wigmore Hall Masterconcert Series and the International Piano Series at London’s South Bank Centre. He plays annually in the Herkulessaal in Munich and has given a series of recitals in Tokyo.

In 1994, Hamelin recorded the piano concerto of Adolf von Henselt with the BBC Scottish Symphony Orchestra conducted by Martyn Brabbins. The technical difficulties of this work had prevented it from becoming well-known despite admiration from Clara Schumann and Franz Liszt.

On the 14th of December 1997, Hamelin performed at the Casals Hall in Tokyo. He played Haydn's Piano Sonata Hob. XVI/52, selections from Godowsky's Studies after Chopin Etudes, Alkan's Concerto for Solo Piano (Op. 39, Nos. 8–10), Gnattali's Manhosamente, Shchedrin's Humoresque, the first movement of Eckhardt-Gramatté's Piano Sonata No. 6, E. 130, and his own Etude No. 12.

On the 31st of March, 2001, Hamelin performed Busoni's Piano Concerto at Sibelius Hall in Lahti, Finland with the Lahti Symphony Orchestra and the YL Male Voice Choir. On the 21st of June, 2001, Hamelin performed this piece with the Orchestre de la Suisse Romande in Geneva, Switzerland. And he also performed it with The City of Birmingham Symphony Orchestra and the Men's Voices of The City of Birmingham Symphony Orchestra Chorus conducted by Mark Elder.

On January 25, 2003, Hamelin performed Busoni's Piano Concerto with the Dallas Symphony Orchestra and Men of Dallas Symphony Chorus at the Morton H. Meyerson Symphony Center conducted by Andrew Litton.

In 2005, Hamelin performed Saint-Saëns's Piano Concerto No. 4 at the Grand Teton Music Festival conducted by Yan Pascal Tortelier

In 2006, Hamelin performed Saint-Saëns's Piano Concerto No. 5 with the Bochumer Symphoniker conducted by Steven Sloane.

In 2012, Hamelin performed the Nikolai Medtner Piano Concerto No. 2 in Moscow with the National Philharmonic of Russia conducted by Dmitry Vasiliev.

In 2020, he performed with the Naumburg Orchestral Concerts, on a special livestream concert with violinist Lara St. John and the Ulysses Quartet due to worldwide restrictions related to the COVID-19 pandemic.

Hamelin has recorded a wide variety of composers' music with the Hyperion label. He is well known for his attention to lesser-known composers, especially of the late nineteenth and early twentieth centuries (Max Reger's Piano Concerto, Leo Ornstein, Nikolai Roslavets, Georgy Catoire, Paul Dukas), and for performing works by pianist-composers Sophie-Carmen Eckhardt-Gramatté, Leopold Godowsky, Charles-Valentin Alkan, Kaikhosru Shapurji Sorabji, Alexander Scriabin, Nikolai Kapustin, Franz Liszt, Nikolai Medtner and Frederic Rzewski.

Hamelin recorded the Johannes Brahms Piano Quartets with the Leopold String Trio.

Hamelin has also composed several works, including a set of piano études in all of the minor keys (12 Études in All The Minor Keys); completed in 2009, it was published by C. F. Peters, with a recording released on Hyperion. A cycle of seven pieces, Con Intimissimo Sentimento, was published (with a recording by Hamelin) by Ongaku No Tomo Sha; and a transcription of Zequinha de Abreu's Tico-Tico No Fubá has been published by Schott Music. Although the majority of his compositions are for solo piano, he has also written three pieces for player piano (including the comical Circus Galop, Pop Music for Player Piano based upon "Pop Goes the Weasel", and Solfeggietto a cinque, based on a theme by C.P.E. Bach), and several works for other instruments, including Fanfares for three trumpets, published by Presser. His other works are distributed by the Sorabji Archive.

Note: Refer to 'External Links' for more details (discography etc.).

=== Awards and honours ===
In 1985, Hamelin won the Carnegie Hall International Competition for American Music; he made his recital debut at Carnegie Hall in 1988.

His recording of Leopold Godowsky's complete Studies on Chopin's Études won the 2000 Gramophone Magazine Instrumental Award.

In 2004, Hamelin received the international record award in Cannes.

He has been made an Officer of the Order of Canada and a Chevalier de l'Ordre national du Québec (National Order of Québec).

He has won seven Juno Awards, most recently in 2012 for Classical Album of the Year: Solo or Chamber Ensemble, for his Liszt Piano Sonatas album.

== Critical appraisal ==
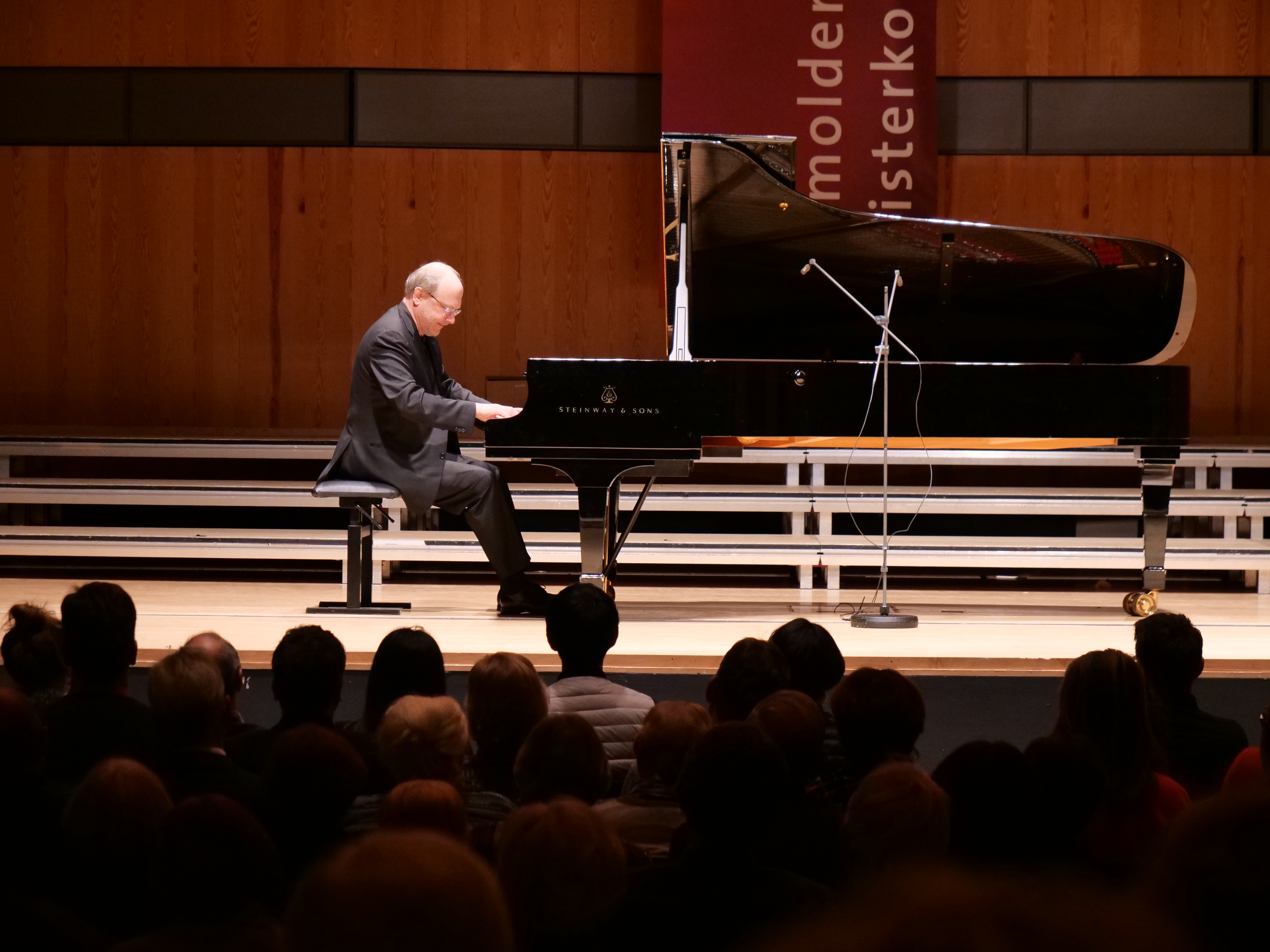
Hamelin playing in 2018

Writing in The New Yorker in 2000, senior critic Alex Ross said: "Hamelin’s legend will grow—right now there is no one like him." Later in 2010, Ross added that Hamelin was ranked highly by piano connoisseurs, and "admired for his monstrously brilliant technique and his questing, deep-thinking approach."

In 2015, Zachary Woolfe, classical music editor of The New York Times, noted Mr. Hamelin's "preternatural clarity and control, qualities that in him don’t preclude sensitivity [or] even poetry".

== Personal life ==
Hamelin's first marriage was to soprano Jody Karin Applebaum. He currently lives in Boston, Massachusetts, with his second wife Cathy Fuller, a pianist and WGBH classical music broadcaster. Hamelin has Type 1 diabetes.

== See also ==
- List of classical pianists
- Canadian classical music
- List of people from Montreal
- List of Canadian musicians
