= Étude Op. 25, No. 9 (Chopin) =

Étude by Frédéric Chopin

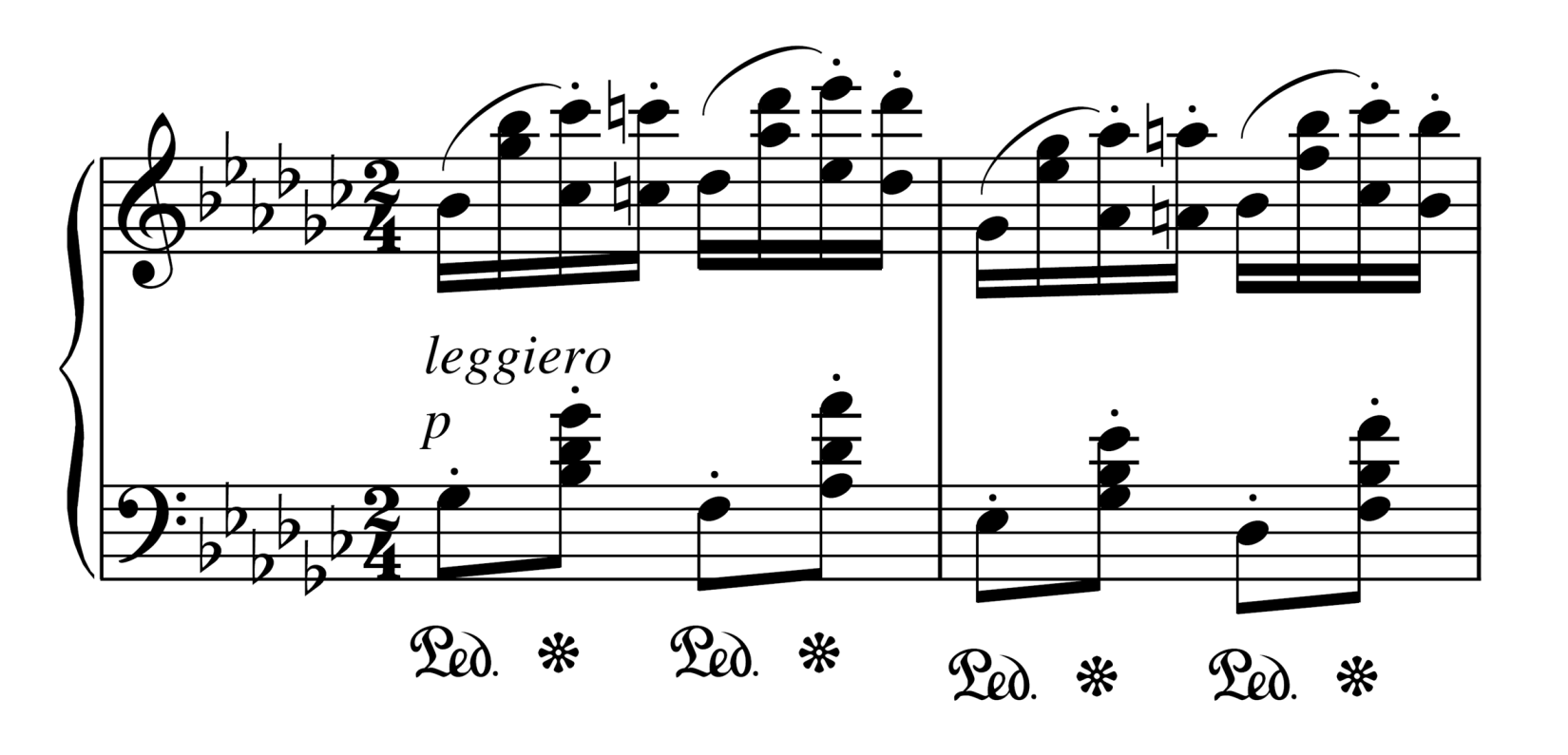
Incipit of the Étude Op. 25, No. 9

Étude Op. 25, No. 9 in G♭ major, known as the Butterfly étude, is an étude by Frédéric Chopin. The title Butterfly was not given by Chopin (as is true for all Chopin pieces with such titles); however Arthur Friedheim said, "while some titles were superfluous, this one is inadequate."

== Analysis ==
Étude Op. 25, No. 9
Performed by Martha Goldstein on an 1851 Érard piano

Étude Op. 25, No. 9
Performed by Romuald Greiss on an 1850 Budynowicz piano

The composition is a study of staccato – marcato alternations, marked throughout the piece. The piece is marked Allegro assai and is written in 2/4 meter. It is the shortest of Chopin's études, lasting under a minute played at the indicated tempo. The melody is created by playing a detached octave, then two non-detached octaves. This makes a four-note group, the structure of which is used during the whole piece to convey the melody. The structure of rapid octaves can pose a challenge to the less technically experienced. Another difficulty is in the constant switching of solid octaves to detached octaves. It is much more straightforward to simply play one or the other for the whole piece.
