= Leopold Godowsky =

Lithuanian-American pianist and composer (1870–1938)

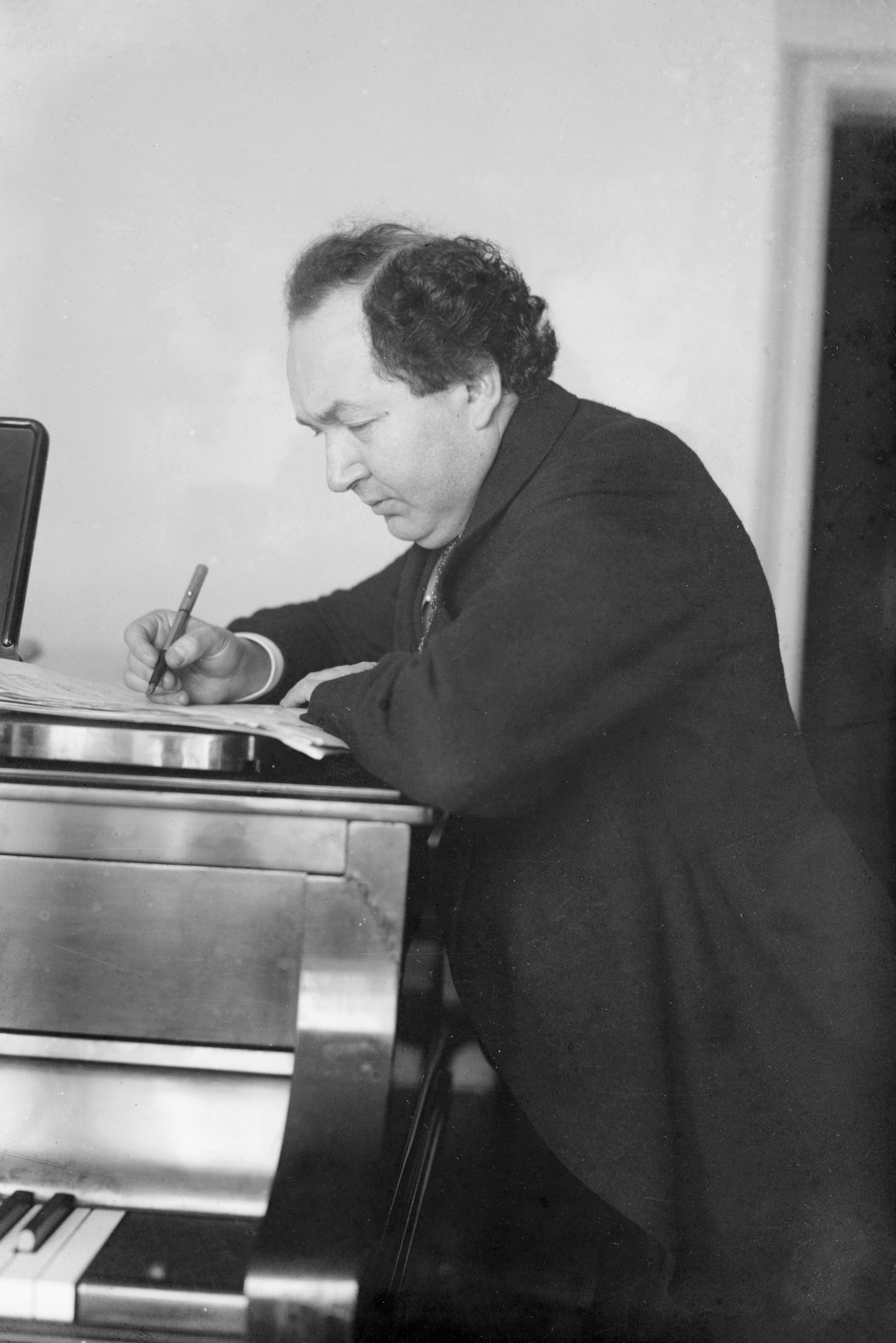
Godowsky (1915)

Leopold Mordkhelovich Godowsky Sr. (/ɡəˈdɔːfski, ɡɔː-/; 13 February 1870 – 21 November 1938) was a virtuoso pianist, composer and teacher, born in what is now Lithuania to Jewish parents, who became an American citizen in 1891. He was one of the most highly regarded performers of his time, known for his theories concerning the application of relaxed weight and economy of motion within pianistic technique – principles later propagated by his pupils, such as Heinrich Neuhaus.

He was heralded among musical giants as the "Buddha of the Piano". Ferruccio Busoni claimed that he and Godowsky were "the only composers to have added anything of significance to keyboard writing since Franz Liszt."

As a composer, Godowsky is best known for his Java Suite, Triakontameron, Passacaglia and Walzermasken, alongside his transcriptions of works by other composers; the best-known of these works are the 53 Studies on Chopin's Études (1894–1914).

== Life ==
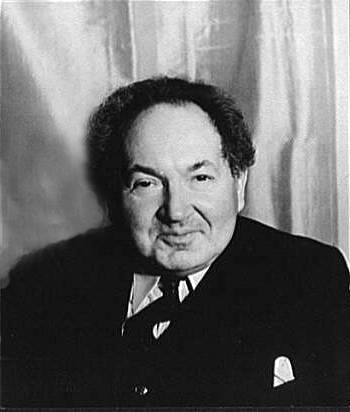
Godowsky (1935; by Carl Van Vechten)

Leopold Godowsky was born in Žasliai (then Vilna Governorate, Russian Empire, now Lithuania) to Jewish parents, Mordkhel Godowsky (1848–1872), from Merkinė, and Khana-Sheyna Godowsky (née Levin, 1848–1918), from Gelvonai. His parents were married on 4 December 1868 in Širvintos. Godowsky's father, a respected feldsher, died in a cholera epidemic only eighteen months after his son's birth, and Leopold was raised by his mother and foster-parents, Louis and Minna Passinock, in Vilnius.

His talent manifested itself very early, and by age five Godowsky was already composing and becoming proficient on both piano and violin. He gave his first concert at age nine, and toured throughout Lithuania and East Prussia soon afterwards. Although he received a few lessons in his childhood, Godowsky was almost completely self-taught. Godowsky wrote in his autobiographical fragment, Retrospect:

I would be very glad could I have stated with truth that I was a pupil of [Franz] Liszt or any other great man, but I was not. I have not had three months lessons in my life. I have been told I was playing the piano before I was two. I think, however, an imaginative family perpetrated this story. I cannot vouch for the truth one way or the other. I have had some extraordinary experience, and this may have happened. I do not remember whether anybody taught me the value and meaning of notes and the use of the fingers of the keyboard, or whether I acquired my knowledge in an autodidactic way, but I do remember that I had no help from my fifth year on.

After briefly studying under Ernst Rudorff at the Königliche Hochschule für Musik in Berlin he left for the United States, where he made his first concert appearance in Boston in 1884. In 1885–86 Godowsky continued his American career, first playing at the New York Casino, and then, in 1886, embarking on a large tour of north-eastern US and Canada with violinist Ovide Musin. In 1887 he returned to Europe and gave numerous recitals in Paris and London, eventually becoming a protégé and friend of Camille Saint-Saëns.

In 1890 he returned to the United States and began a pedagogical career by joining the staff of the New York College of Music. On 30 April 1891 Godowsky married Frieda Saxe, a childhood friend, and the day after his marriage became a citizen of the United States. In 1891–93 he held a teaching position at the Gilbert Raynolds Combs's Broad Street Conservatory in Philadelphia, and then settled in Chicago, where he taught at the Chicago Conservatory. By the late 1890s Godowsky was extremely well known in North America.

Together with Teresa Carreño, Godowsky was the first pianist to teach the principle of weight release as distinct from purely muscular momentum; also during the same decade, the first of Godowsky's studies on Chopin études were composed and published, later to become part of a large series, one of Godowsky's most famous works. In 1897–98 Godowsky further cemented his fame by giving a series of eight concerts surveying the entire 19th century repertoire.

A particularly successful concert at the Beethoven Hall (Beethoven-Saal) in Berlin, on 6 December 1900, enhanced Godowsky's reputation greatly. He moved to Berlin, again dividing his time between performing and teaching and giving a concert tour every year. In 1909 he took over Ferruccio Busoni's master classes at the Vienna Academy of Music, where he continued to teach until 1914. Between 1912 and 1914 Godowsky gave several concerts in the United States and also made his first gramophone records there.

In 1914 the outbreak of World War I drove him away from Europe and he went back to the United States, where he lived in New York (1914–16), Los Angeles (1916–19), and Seattle (1919–22), before returning to New York. Much of the 1920s was spent touring around the world; apart from concert appearances in Europe and the United States, Godowsky also gave extensive tours of South America and East Asia.

Also during the 1920s he recorded many rolls for the Duo-Art reproducing pianos, the only reproducing piano mechanism that was available in concert grand Steinways. Godowsky also recorded a large number of piano rolls for the American Piano Company.

However, while Godowsky's career prospered, his personal life became increasingly troubled. His wife Frieda fell seriously ill in 1924 and her health continued to deteriorate. In 1928 Godowsky's son Gordon abandoned his studies and married a vaudeville dancer, causing his father to disown him.

After the Wall Street crash of 1929 Godowsky's financial situation worsened. A string of recordings the pianist began in London in 1928, as well as public concerts, would have remedied the problem; however, both activities were cut short by an unexpected disaster: during a recording session on 17 June 1930, just after completing Chopin's E major Scherzo, the pianist suffered a severe stroke which left him partially paralysed. Godowsky's remaining years were overshadowed by the event, leaving him deeply depressed.

In December 1932 Gordon Godowsky died by suicide, and a year later Godowsky's wife died of a heart attack. The pianist eventually moved to another apartment in New York together with his daughter Dagmar; he continued playing piano for friends and admirers, but never again gave public performances.

In his last years, Godowsky put much effort into organizing a World Synod of Music and Musicians and an International Council of Music and Musicians, but neither project materialized. After spending much of 1937 and 1938 suffering from various health problems, Godowsky died of stomach cancer on 21 November 1938, at the age of 68. He is buried in the Temple Israel Cemetery in Westchester County, New York.

His son Leopold Godowsky Jr. was the co-inventor (with Leopold Mannes) of Kodachrome photo transparency film, as well as a violinist. Leopold Jr. married George Gershwin's younger sister, Frances, thus continuing the musical line.

His daughter, the actress Dagmar Godowsky (1897–1975), appeared as a co-lead in various Hollywood silent movies, including some with Rudolph Valentino. She was a popular socialite and wrote an autobiography titled First Person Plural (New York, 1958).

== Compositions ==
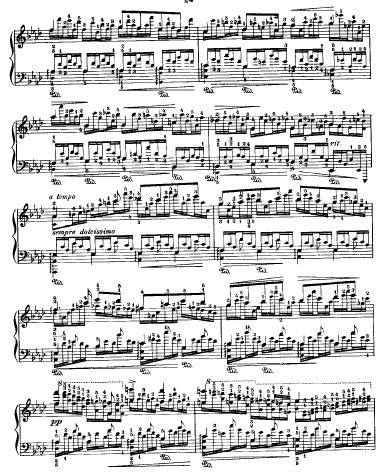
A page from Godowsky's highly challenging Studies on Chopin's Études (an arrangement of Op. 25, No. 1)

As a composer, Godowsky has been best known for his paraphrases of piano pieces by other composers, which he enhanced with complex contrapuntal devices and rich chromatic harmonies. His most famous work in this genre is the 53 Studies on Chopin's Études (1894–1914), in which he varies the (already challenging) original études using various methods: introducing countermelodies, transferring the technically difficult passages from the right hand to the left, transcribing an entire piece for left hand solo, or even interweaving two études, with the left hand playing one and the right hand the other.

The pieces are among the most difficult piano works ever written, and relatively few pianists have performed or recorded any of them. Among such are Marc-André Hamelin, who recorded the entire set and garnered a number of prestigious awards, and Francesco Libetta, who performed the complete set in concert (the only pianist to do so from memory) and made a video recording of the set (live in Milan, March 2006). Other pianists who frequently perform Godowsky are Boris Berezovsky, Konstantin Scherbakov and Emanuele Delucchi.

Other important transcriptions by Godowsky include Renaissance (1906–09), a collection which includes arrangements of music by Rameau and Lully, 12 Schubert Songs (1927), and six transcriptions of Bach's solo string music.

Although his transcriptions are much more well known, Godowsky also composed a number of substantial original works. He considered the Passacaglia (1927) and a collection of pieces for left hand alone (1930–31) to be his most mature creations; both, however, employ traditional approach to harmony and counterpoint. A more experimental work was the Java Suite (1925), written after a visit to Java and influenced by gamelan music. Godowsky was equally comfortable writing large-scale works like the Passacaglia or the five-movement Piano Sonata in E minor (1911) as he was creating collections of smaller pieces, such as the 46 Miniatures for piano four hands and the Triakontameron (1920; subtitled "30 moods and scenes in triple measure").

Many of Godowsky's original works are considerably difficult to perform; the Passacaglia (which consists of 44 variations, cadenza and fugue on the opening theme of Franz Schubert's "Unfinished" Symphony) was declared to be unplayable by Vladimir Horowitz, who claimed it would require six hands to perform. Nevertheless, the work has had a number of recordings.

Despite their traditionalism, Godowsky's compositions may have influenced Maurice Ravel and Sergei Prokofiev.

== Reception and influence ==
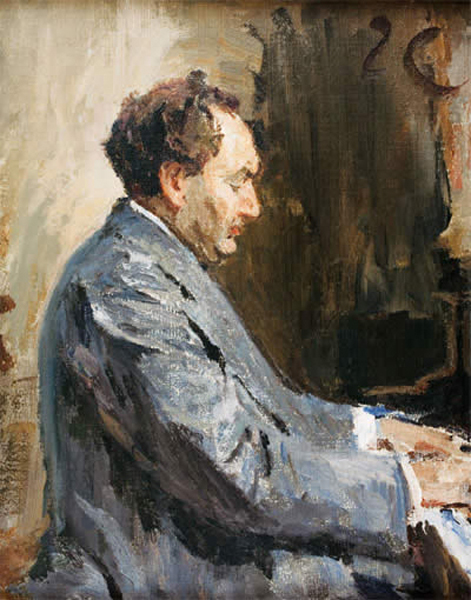
Portrait of the composer at the piano by Polish painter Jan Ciągliński (1911)

Godowsky was one of the most highly regarded pianists of his time, praised by listeners, colleagues, and critics alike. Arthur Rubinstein remarked that it would take him "five hundred years to get a mechanism like [Godowsky's]", while Ferruccio Busoni considered himself and Godowsky to be the only composers to have made substantial contributions to keyboard writing and performance since Liszt.

Godowsky's phenomenally difficult transcriptions and impeccable technique prompted James Huneker to describe him as "a pianist for pianists". Among Godowsky's admirers were distinguished pianists Vladimir de Pachmann and Sergei Rachmaninoff, who, according to Godowsky's daughter Dagmar, idolized her father's music and performances.

Even those who disliked Godowsky's interpretations usually acknowledged his tremendous technical gifts: Claudio Arrau, for example, declared Godowsky "one of the greatest technicians", even though he considered his playing "boring" and complained that Godowsky "never played above mezzo-forte."

Godowsky's vast repertoire spanned more than two centuries of music, from contemporary music to that of Rameau and Lully, whose music he transcribed. Although he regularly played public concerts until 1930, Godowsky was plagued by stage fright, and particularly disliked the recording studio, like many performers of his time. On one occasion, he described the recording process thus:

The fear of doing a trifling wrong augmented while playing; the better one succeeded in playing the foregoing, the greater the fear became while playing. It was a dreadful ordeal, increasingly so the more sensitive the artist, I broke down in my health in London in the Spring of 1930, owing to these nerve-killing tortures. How can one think of emotion!

Consequently, it was acknowledged that Godowsky's best work was not in public or in the recording studio, but at home. After leaving Godowsky's home one night, Josef Hofmann told Abram Chasins: "Never forget what you heard tonight; never lose the memory of that sound. There is nothing like it in the world. It is tragic that the world has never heard Popsy as only he can play."

Godowsky's pupils included Paul Wells, Apolinary Szeluto, Jan Smeterlin, Issay Dobrowen, Tina Lerner, Fannie Charles Dillon, Alice Frisca, Leonard Liebling, Abbey Simon, Hanna Vollenhoven, Myrtle Elvyn, and Heinrich Neuhaus, who taught Sviatoslav Richter, Emil Gilels, and Radu Lupu, among others.
