= Three Fantastic Dances =

1922 set of three piano pieces by Dmitri Shostakovich

- by Dmitri Shostakovich
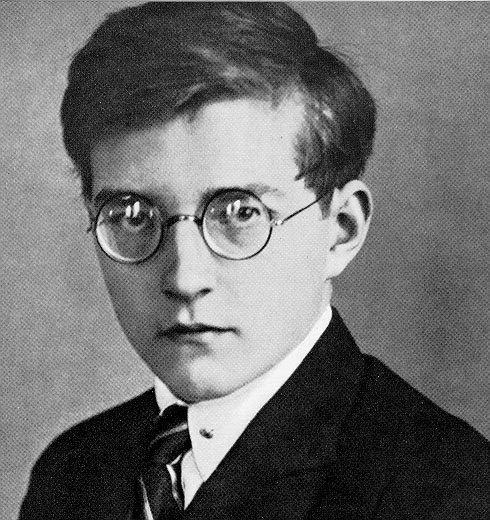
- Dmitri Shostakovich in 1925
- Native name: Три фантастических танца
- Opus: 5
- Composed: December 4, 1920–1922
- Dedication: Iosif Shvarts
- Published: 1926
- Publisher: Muzgiz, Hans Sikorski Musikverlage
- Duration: 5 minutes
- Movements: 3
- Scoring: piano

Premiere
- Date: July 31, 1922 or March 20, 1923
- Location: State Institute of the History of Art or Small Hall of the Petrograd Conservatory, Petrograd, Russian SFSR
- Performers: Dmitri Shostakovich

The Three Fantastic Dances (Russian: Три фантастических танца, romanized: Tri fantasticheskikh tantsa), Op. 5 (Note: Originally published as Op. 1.) are a set of three piano pieces composed by Dmitri Shostakovich while he was a student at the Petrograd Conservatory. They are dedicated to Iosif Shvarts, a friend and fellow pupil in the piano class of Leonid Nikolayev.

== History ==
Shostakovich completed the first of the Three Fantastic Dances on December 4, 1920, with the remaining two completed in 1922. He dedicated the work to his friend Iosif Shvarts, a fellow pianist and pupil in the class of Leonid Nikolayev, who esteemed him as one of his best students. Shostakovich himself admired Shvarts' playing and said he was "fascinated by his fine polish, meticulous penetration of the composer's wishes, and excellent technique."

Sources conflict as to when and where the Three Fantastic Dances was premiered. Hans Sikorski Musikverlage, which publishes Shostakovich's music, lists March 20, 1923, at the Small Hall of the Petrograd Conservatory as the premiere date and location. Andrei Kryukov wrote that according to the conservatory's records, the premiere took place on July 31, 1922, as part of a series of Monday evening concerts of new music presented at the State Institute of the History of Art in Petrograd.

According to Yuri Tyulin, the Three Fantastic Dances "amazed [Shostakovich's fellow students] with their freshness, originality, and mature mastery." Later in 1923, Shostakovich collaborated on a choreographic treatment of the music with Mariya Ponna, a champion swimmer turned dancer, and Kasyan Goleizovsky. This was performed at the Main Hall of the Bureau of Weights and Measures. Shostakovich's mother, who attended the performance, was reportedly scandalized. According to Sofia Khentova, Shostakovich drew on the experience with Ponna and Goleizovsky while composing his first ballet, The Golden Age.

Shostakovich included the Three Fantastic Dances on his Moscow concert debut as composer and pianist on March 20, 1925. The program included a selection of his vocal, chamber, and solo piano works, as well as music by his friend Vissarion Shebalin.

== Publication and the composer's recordings ==
Maximilian Steinberg wrote in his diary on January 16, 1924, that the composer had played to him his Three Fantastic Dances and Eight Preludes, Op. 2 earlier that day and that he stated his intent to publish them. Shostakovich did not approach the State Music Publishing House, Muzgiz, about publishing the Three Fantastic Dances until 1925. Their editorial board initially rejected the work for publication. On March 21, 1925, Shostakovich wrote to his mother about the situation:

The only thing that makes me a little sad is that the Three Fantastic Dances were not accepted for publication. Not accepted and to hell with it. No use crying about it. […] Wait. It is not our time yet. We will make it.

In January 1926, Steinberg sent the score for Muzgiz to reconsider. The editorial board invited Shostakovich to play some of his works for them in February. According to Nikolai Myaskovsky, one of the board's members, told Steinberg that Shostakovich's music and playing "drew near-unanimous protests" from the editors. By February 9, he reported that the board had "radically changed" their opinions and accepted the Three Fantastic Dances, Two Pieces for String Octet, and the First Symphony for publication "despite their occasional mawkishness." Shostakovich wrote to his mother again on February 11 expressing his happiness over the outcome:

Little by little, not even a little, but right away I am starting to make a name for myself. […] Everything was accepted unanimously, which greatly pleases me. Even more I am glad that this happened here in Russia and not somewhere abroad.

The Three Fantastic Dances were first published by Muzgiz in 1926 in an edition of 200 copies. It was Shostakovich's first published work. They immediately became popular among Russian music students. Shostakovich's orchestration of the first dance, an assignment for Steinberg's composition class, remains unpublished.

Shostakovich recorded the Three Fantastic Dances in 1947 and 1958.

== Music ==
The Three Fantastic Dances consist of:

1. March – Allegretto, C major
2. Waltz – Andantino, C major
3. Polka – Allegretto, C major

A typical performance lasts approximately five minutes. Metronome markings are lacking in the original manuscript, but Shostakovich's tempi in his own recordings for each dance were = 168, = 130, and = 112 respectively.

== Cited sources ==
- Digonskaya, Ol'ga (2010). "Mitya Shostakovich's first opus (dating the Scherzo op. 1)". In Fairclough, Pauline (ed.). Shostakovich Studies 2. Cambridge: Cambridge University Press. ISBN 978-0521111188.
- Khentova, Sofia (1975). Молодые годы Шостаковича, Т. 1 (in Russian). Moscow: Советский композитор.
- Khentova, Sofia (1985). Шостакович. Жизнь и творчество, Т. 1 (in Russian). Moscow: Советский композитор.
- Miller, Larisa (2013). "Первые издания". In Kovnatskaya, Lyudmila (ed.). Шостакович в Ленинградской консерватории: 1919-1930, Т. 2 (in Russian). Saint Petersburg: Композитор. ISBN 978-5-7379-0726-6.
- Moshevich, Sofia (2004). "Chapter 1: Roots, 1906–1923". Dmitri Shostakovich, Pianist. Montreal: McGill-Queen's University Press. ISBN 0773525815.
- Moshevich, Sofia (2015). Shostakovich's Music for Piano Solo: Interpretation and Performance. Bloomington/Indianapolis: Indiana University Press. ISBN 978-0-253-01422-1.
