= Sean Botkin =

American pianist and music professor

- Born: Sean D. Botkin; Federal Way, Washington
- Genres: Classical
- Occupation(s): Pianist, Music professor
- Instrument: Piano

Sean Botkin is an American pianist and music professor.

== Early life ==
Botkin grew up in Federal Way, Washington, where he took his first piano lessons at age 5. Four years later, he made his first orchestral appearance with the Honolulu Symphony under Ernest Chang's guidance.

== Education ==
He attended the University of Washington, where he took piano lessons from Neal O’Doan. Under his guidance he played for both the Seattle Symphony and Spokane Symphony and participated with the Seattle Philharmonic Orchestra. From 1987 to 1988, he studied at the Aspen Music Festival and Aspen Music School where his teachers were Aube Tzerko and John Perry. From 1985 to 1986, he was a Tape Audition Winner.

From 1989 to 1995, Botkin studied with Martin Canin at the Bowdoin College. In 1996, he enrolled at the University of Washington, where he was taught by Craig Sheppard. He then moved on to Stanford University, where he studied under Adolph Baller and graduated with a Bachelor of Arts degree. Prior to graduating, Botkin performed with the Stanford Symphony Orchestra, Palo Alto Chamber Orchestra and Palo Alto Philharmonic Orchestra, where he made a recording of the Johann Sebastian Bach's D minor concerto.

He also attended and then graduated from Juilliard School with a master of music degree, where he studied again under Martin Canin and joined the Professional Studies program. While a student at Juilliard, he received a Gina Bachauer Scholarship and was a performer of the Piano Concerto No. 2 at Alice Tully Hall under a conduction of Carl St. Clair. He also earned an Artist Diploma from the South Bend Indiana University, and then began teaching at the Alexander Toradze's Piano Studio.

== Career ==
Botkin is co-founder with Dmitri Vorobiev of the Midwest International Piano Competition held at the University of Northern Iowa's Gallagher-Bluedorn Performing Arts Center in Cedar Falls, Iowa, where the two founders are UNI piano professors.

In 2012, Botkin was the featured pianist with the Chicago Symphony Orchestra.

About his 2016 concert at Carnegie Hall, New York Concert Review wrote that during the "First Sonata" by Rachmaninoff, Botkin's "mastery is evident in every passage."

He played himself in the 2011 documentary film Kicking the Notes the Toradze Way, about the life of piano virtuoso Alexander Toradze.

== Awards ==
Botkin received one of his first awards at age 16 when he was named runner up in the 1986 Joseph Fisch Piano Competition.

In 1997, he won the fourth prize in the Ferruccio Busoni International Piano Competition in Italy.

In 1998, he was a finalist in the Gina Bachauer International Piano Competition.

He was also a prizewinner in the Cleveland International Piano Competition, Dong-A International Music Competition, William Kapell International Piano Competition, Washington International Competition, World Piano Competition, and International Music Competition.
