= Eleanor Sokoloff =

American pianist and academic (1914–2020)

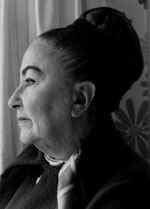
- Sokoloff in 2015

Background information
- Born: Eleanor Blum; June 16, 1914; Cleveland, Ohio, U.S.
- Origin: Cleveland Institute of Music; Curtis Institute of Music
- Died: July 12, 2020 (aged 106) Philadelphia, Pennsylvania, U.S.
- Occupations: Classical pianist; Teacher; Curtis Institute of Music

Eleanor Sokoloff (née Blum; June 16, 1914 – July 12, 2020) was an American pianist and academic who formed a piano duo with her husband, Vladimir Sokoloff. She taught piano on the faculty of the Curtis Institute of Music from 1936 until her death in 2020.

== Early life and education ==
Born in Cleveland, Ohio, Sokoloff was the daughter of a barber. Her mother was an amateur singer and encouraged her daughter's musical interests. She began her studies with Ruth Edwards at the Cleveland Institute of Music at the age of eight. In 1931, she enrolled at the Curtis Institute of Music, where she studied piano with David Saperton and chamber music with Louis Bailly.

== Career ==
Sokoloff later studied the duo-piano repertoire with Vera Brodsky and Harold Triggs and eventually formed a duo team with her husband, pianist Vladimir Sokoloff. Vladimir was also on the piano faculty at Curtis and from 1938 to 1950 was the pianist for the Philadelphia Orchestra. One of their daughters, Laurie, was the principal piccolist of the Baltimore Symphony for 47 years. Their other daughter, Kathy, became director of development at the Settlement Music School.

Eleanor joined the Curtis faculty in 1936, at first as an instructor to non-piano majors, and in 1950 became a full-fledged member of the piano faculty. Since then, more than seventy-five of her students have been chosen to perform as soloists with the Philadelphia Orchestra. Among her alumni are Hugh Sung, Lambert Orkis, Susan Starr, Claire Huangci, Kit Armstrong, Craig Sheppard, Keith Jarrett, Sean Kennard, Jerome Lowenthal, Terence Yung, Leon McCawley, and Randall Hodgkinson. In 2001, in recognition of her tenure, Sokoloff received the Curtis Alumni Award. She turned 100 in June 2014 and was praised in a ceremony as "free of nostalgia for the good old days while still embodying the highest of golden-age standards". She was awarded a Lifetime Achievement Award by Curtis that same year.

== Personal life ==
Sokoloff died in Philadelphia of natural causes on July 12, 2020, at the age of 106.
