= Terence Yung =

Chinese classical pianist

- Born: Ho Ka Terence Yung; Hong Kong, China
- Known for: The Yung Conspiracy; Really Good Piano Playing with Terence Yung

Academic background
- Education: University of Pennsylvania (SpecCert); University of London (LLB); University of Houston (BA/BM); Académie internationale d'été de Nice (Diplôme); The Juilliard School; Yale University; The Wharton School; SDA Bocconi School of Management
- Thesis: A Liberal Morality Analysis of Gross Negligence Manslaughter (2023)
- Academic advisor: Laura Lammasniemi

Academic work
- Discipline: Arbitration; Criminal Law; Jurisprudence; Legal theory Moral psychology
- Website: www.researchgate.net/profile/Terence-Yung ulondon.academia.edu/TerenceYung

Terence Yung
- Genre: Classical
- Occupations: Teacher, Musician, International Arbitrator
- Instrument: Piano
- Website: https://www.bach-cantatas.com/Bio/Yung-Terence.htm

Ho Ka Terence Yung (Chinese: 容何家; born Hong Kong, China) is a classical pianist, international arbitrator, author of the legal blog The Yung Conspiracy, and host of the classical music podcast Really Good Piano Playing with Terence Yung.

== Education ==
At the age of five, Yung was found playing melodies by ear. Yung, who grew up in the United States, studied privately with Eleanor Sokoloff of the Curtis Institute of Music. He later trained at the Juilliard School pre-college program in New York City, where he was a scholarship student of Frank Lévy and Martin Canin (the teaching assistant of the eminent pedagogue Rosina Lhévinne). He continued his studies with Abbey Simon (who himself was a pupil of Josef Hofmann) at the University of Houston in Texas on a music scholarship and Pell grant. While at the university, he taught students from families of extreme poverty at the Yellowstone Academy in the Third Ward part of Houston as part of its urban outreach initiatives. Yung excelled academically, winning prizes for English essays. He graduated in 2012 with a Bachelor of Arts from the Department of English and a Bachelor of Music from the Moores School of Music, obtaining summa cum laude honors in both degrees. Upon graduation, he was inducted into the Sigma Tau Delta and Phi Kappa Phi honor societies. He also holds the prestigious Diplôme from the Académie internationale d'été de Nice in France, where he studied with Michel Béroff and Philippe Entremont. Additionally, he took lessons (informally) with Lang Lang, Susan Starr, Garrick Ohlsson, Kenneth Boulton, and Horacio Gutierrez.

Yung matriculated at the University of Texas School of Law in Austin, Texas on a full scholarship. While at Texas, he served as a law clerk for the Texas Attorney General, the Travis County Attorney's Office, and the Texas Advocacy Project. He also edited for the Texas Review of Law and Politics and the Texas Intellectual Property Law Journal. He later enrolled at the University of London, where he earned a Bachelor of Laws with First Class Honours. He was called to the Chartered Institute of Arbitrators in London, England as an Associate Member (ACIArb) in 2022. He earned a Certificate in Healthcare Law from Penn and has completed advanced coursework with Yale, Wharton, and Bocconi.

== Music career ==
Yung has appeared as a recitalist, chamber-musician, and soloist with orchestras throughout the United States including performances in Philadelphia, New York City, Seattle, and Houston, as well as abroad in Spain and France. He made his first public appearance at the age of 6. At age 11, he was asked to perform Beethoven's "Waldstein" Sonata at the Kimmel Center for the Performing Arts' Master Class Series for the pianist Jon Kimura Parker. At age 13, he made his professional début with the Delaware Symphony Orchestra at the Grand Opera House Youth Concert Series.

Notable venues include the Kimmel Center in Philadelphia, the Teatro de Puigcerdá, the Grand Opera House in Delaware, Benaroya Hall, Yamaha Salon, Steinway Hall in New York City, the Kosciuszko Foundation, and the Museum of Fine Arts in Houston. He has also appeared at a number of international music festivals including the Puigcerdá International Music Festival, the International Keyboard Institute and Festival at Mannes College, the Seattle International Piano Festival, and the International Piano Festival in Houston. His recordings and interviews have been broadcast by radio and television throughout the United States and abroad.

Yung has been the subject of a number of interviews by Ming Pao Daily News and Global Chinese Times as well as French Public News as an outstanding young talent from Hong Kong. Mr. Yung has been an advocate for the education and outreach of classical music. He is affiliated with Sing For Hope, volunteering with its Healing Arts initiative to bring the gift of music to doctors and patients at the Mount Sinai Hospital in New York City.

In 2010, Yung was selected as a Young Steinway Artist. He is currently host of the classical music podcast Really Good Piano Playing with Terence Yung. Syndicated over Youtube and Instagram, it is the most listened-to channel in the world featuring performances of Terence Yung.

== Personal life ==
Yung is the grandson of Yung Yi-Yin, a prominent educationalist who was headmaster of several Government primary schools in Hong Kong. In 1980, the elder Yung was awarded a Medal of Honour (Hong Kong) for valuable services rendered by him to Hong Kong by Her Majesty Queen Elizabeth II, which was presented to him before an audience by the 25th Governor of Hong Kong Murray MacLehose, Baron MacLehose of Beoch. Yung has donated to Democrats and Republicans, including U.S. Senator Elizabeth Warren and Governor of Texas Greg Abbott. He has been a member of the Federalist Society, the American Constitution Society, as well as the American Bar Association, and has donated to Students for Fair Admissions. In 2019, Yung received a 46-month sentence for cyberstalking after pleading guilty and agreeing to pay restitution.
