= Hugh Sung =

American pianist

Hugh Sung (born September 25, 1969) is a Korean-American classical pianist.

== Early life ==
Born in Philadelphia, Pennsylvania, Sung began studying the piano with his mother at the age of three. At the age of eight, he began private studies with Eleanor Sokoloff. Sung made his debut with the Philadelphia Orchestra three years later, performing the Mozart Piano Concerto in B-flat major, K. 456 with his own cadenza. In 1982, at the age of thirteen, Sung was admitted to the Curtis Institute of Music, where he continued his musical studies with Eleanor Sokoloff, Jorge Bolet and Seymour Lipkin.

== Career ==
Hugh Sung performing in South Korea

By the time Sung graduated from the Curtis Institute of Music with a bachelor's degree, he had performed again with the Philadelphia Orchestra, toured extensively with the South Jersey Symphony Orchestra, and debuted with the Concerto Soloists Orchestra (currently known as the Chamber Orchestra of Philadelphia). During his final year of study, Sung started touring collaboratively with legendary violinist Aaron Rosand. That partnership eventually led to his appointment as staff pianist at the Curtis Institute in 1993. Three years later, he was named Director of Instrumental Accompaniment, and then in 1998, Director of Student Recitals.

Visual Recital performance by Hugh Sung in Recife, Brazil 2006

Sung has toured extensively in cities throughout the United States, Canada, South America, England, Japan, Brazil, and South Korea. He has collaborated with renowned musicians such as Julius Baker, Jeffrey Khaner, Hilary Hahn and Leila Josefowicz, as well as contemporary composers such as Jennifer Higdon, Robert Maggio, and Harold Boatrite. Sung has recorded for Naxos Records, Albany Records, Vox, Biddulph, I Virtuosi, CRI, and Avie labels.

Sung has been an advocate for utilizing cutting-edge technologies to enhance the artistry of the classical musician. He developed a customized database to create a paperless office for his administrative work at Curtis. In 2002, shortly after the first Tablet PC's were introduced by Microsoft to the public, Sung adapted an early model for use as a digital music score reader with a foot pedal-activated page turning system. Currently, he is experimenting with live visualization techniques using programs such as Liquid Media and particle generators such as particleIllusion in a framework called the Visual Recital. In 2008, Sung co-founded the company AirTurn which develops wireless page-turning foot pedals for digital sheet music, initially for Tablet PCs, then for tablets such as the iPad. In 2014, Sung joined the faculty of ArtistWorks, an online music education platform where he taught piano students around the world. Sung became the Director of Institutional Solutions at Cunningham Piano Company in 2016, and then became its Vice President in 2018.

== Discography ==
- Sung, Hugh, (piano); Rosand, Aaron (violin) (December 3, 1996). "Brahms: The 3 Violin Sonatas". Vox Classical.
- Sung, Hugh; Bollinger, Blair; Carlson, Eric; Haroz, Nitzan (November 17, 1998). "Fancy Free: Music for Bass Trombone". D'note Classics.
- Sung, Hugh, (piano); Rosand, Aaron (violin) (July 29, 2003). "My Legacy". Artek.
- Sung, Hugh; Khaner, Jeffrey (August 5, 2003). "French Flute Music". Avie.
- Sung, Hugh; Rosand, Aaron (June 12, 2007). "Brahms: 2 Violin Sonatas; 21 Hungarian Dances; Joachim: Romance in B Flat". Musical Concepts.
- Sung, Hugh; Vinci, Mark; Vinci, Jan; Higdon, Jennifer (July 1, 2007). "Global Flutescape". Albany Records.
