= Min-kyung =

- Hangul: 민경
- RR: Mingyeong
- MR: Min'gyŏng

Min-kyung, also spelled Min-kyoung, is a Korean given name.

People with this name include:

- Sim Min-kyung (born 1955), stage name Sim Soo-bong, South Korean female singer
- Min Kwon (full name Min-Kyung Kwon, born 1970s), South Korean-born American female pianist
- Choi Min-kyung (born 1982), South Korean female short track speed skater
- Jun Min-kyung (born 1985), South Korean female football goalkeeper
- Hwang Min-kyoung (born 1990), South Korean female volleyball player
- Kang Min-kyung (born 1990), South Korean female singer, member of Davichi
- Haru Nomura (Korean name Mun Min-gyeong, born 1992), Japanese female golfer of Korean descent

== See also ==
- List of Korean given names
