= Martin Canin =

American pianist and prominent piano pedagogue

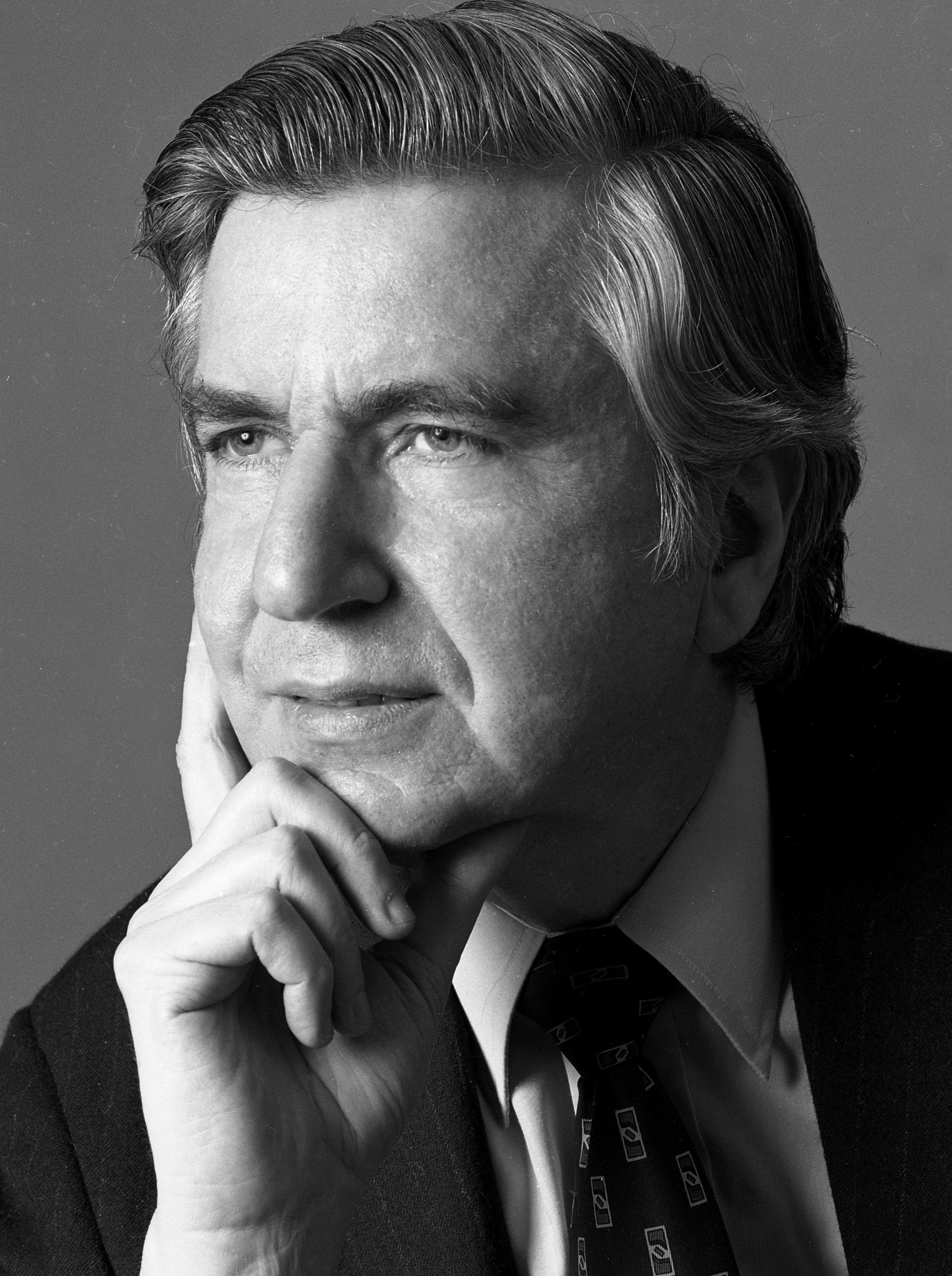
Martin Canin (1981). Photo by Peter Schaaf, reproduced by permission.

Martin Canin (March 23, 1930–May 9, 2019) was an American pianist and prominent piano pedagogue who was on the faculty of The Juilliard School from 1976 to 2016 and of Stony Brook University from 1965 to 1993.

Canin was born in New York City and was a graduate of Juilliard, where he studied under the piano pedagogue Rosina Lhévinne, who along with her husband Josef Lhévinne was part of a long lineage of Russian pianists and teachers. Canin began piano studies at age 7 as a scholarship student at the Henry Street Settlement, on New York's Lower East Side, studying first with Aurelio Giorni and later for a decade with Austrian-born pianist, composer, and conductor Robert Scholz, as well as attending summer-school programs at the Meadowmount School of Music. Canin studied also with the pianist, pedagogue, and critic Olga Samaroff at the Philadelphia Conservatory before entering The Juilliard School.

== Early performances ==
Martin Canin began his career as a piano recitalist; in The New York Times, Harold Schonberg wrote of one concert in 1960 that “Mr. Canin equaled the achievement of any American pianist this reviewer has heard,” and critic and composer Virgil Thomson wrote of Canin's performance in 1949, of the Brahms D Minor Concerto, Op. 15, with the Juilliard Orchestra, that “piano playing so beautiful from every point of view is rare. He is a musician clean through.” Of Canin's debut recital at Carnegie Recital Hall (now Weill Recital Hall) in 1958, New York Times critic Edward Downes wrote, “Only a thoughtful musician would have chosen to include the enormously demanding Sonata of Elliott Carter, dating from 1946, on a debut program. Only an expert technician could have carried it off with such clarity, authority and even brio.” Downes concluded, "In Schubert's 'Wanderer' Fantasy, the pianist showed he not only had a sense of drama, but also musical depth and consistent beauty of tone at his command. This was a distinguished debut."

== Teaching career ==
Although Canin performed in Europe, Asia, and Australia, teaching rather than concertizing became the focus of his professional career. Having graduated from The Juilliard School in 1956, he became an assistant to Rosina Lhévinne there in 1959 and also taught during that period at Teachers College, Columbia University. He was appointed to the Juilliard faculty in 1976. In 1965, he additionally joined the faculty of the State University of New York at Stony Brook, now known as Stony Brook University, as Artist-in-Residence, and he retired from that position in 1993. He also taught at the Bowdoin International Music Festival from 1972 to 2015. Other teaching appointments, in parallel with those at Juilliard and Stony Brook, included the City University of New York and New York University.

As the inheritor of a tradition representing the golden age of Romantic piano virtuosos, Canin extolled the image of the solo pianist, saying in a 1981 interview, “Of course I love chamber music—I love to play it; I love to hear it. But I feel something goes out of our lives if we lose the sense of the single conquering hero on stage. I love the idea that one person gets up there with the Steinway and takes it on—and vanquishes it. And that one person can give us an inspiring evening of music. To me, I feel that the most exciting thing of all is the soloist.”

Among his hundreds of students at Juilliard and Stony Brook, Canin taught numerous laureates of major international piano competitions, including the Busoni, Van Cliburn, Gina Bachauer, Liszt-Bartók, Casadesus, Kapell, Tokyo International, Seoul International, and Queen Elisabeth of Belgium competitions. Canin gave recitals and master classes throughout the world and served on the jury of numerous piano competitions. In addition to his teaching and performances as a solo pianist and chamber musician, he recorded works of Johannes Brahms for Spectrum Records, served as a contributing editor of the magazine The Piano Quarterly, and edited a number of piano works for Éditions Salabert and Lee Roberts Publications. Among his prominent disciples are Sean Botkin, Joel Fan, Madeleine Forte, Arthur Greene, Stephen Hough, Douglas Humpherys, Min Kwon, Mihae Lee, Anne-Marie McDermott, Quynh Nguyen, Haewon Song, Annette Volkamer, Dalit Warshaw, Yung Wook Yoo, and Terence Yung.

== Personal life ==
Along with Martin Canin's association with The Juilliard School as a teacher, that music conservatory also exemplified something of a family tradition. His brother, violinist Stuart Canin, had studied at the school. In 1963, Martin Canin married Fiorella Miotto, also a Juilliard-trained pianist, with whom he had one daughter, violinist Serena Canin of the Brentano String Quartet, herself a Juilliard graduate. Martin Canin died in New York on May 9, 2019 at the age of 89.

== Further reading and listening ==
- Martin Canin performing Johannes Brahms, Piano Sonata No. 3 in F Minor, Op. 5. YouTube.
- “For the Love of Music,” WNCN-FM, New York, NY (March 20, 1981). David Dubal interviews Martin Canin. Program 1 of 2, YouTube. Program 2 of 2, YouTube.
- “Interview with Martin Canin” (November 3, 1991). Lower East Side Oral History Collection and Tamiment Library, New York University.
