= Piano Sonata No. 2 (Shostakovich) =

1943 piano sonata by Dmitri Shostakovich

- by Dmitri Shostakovich
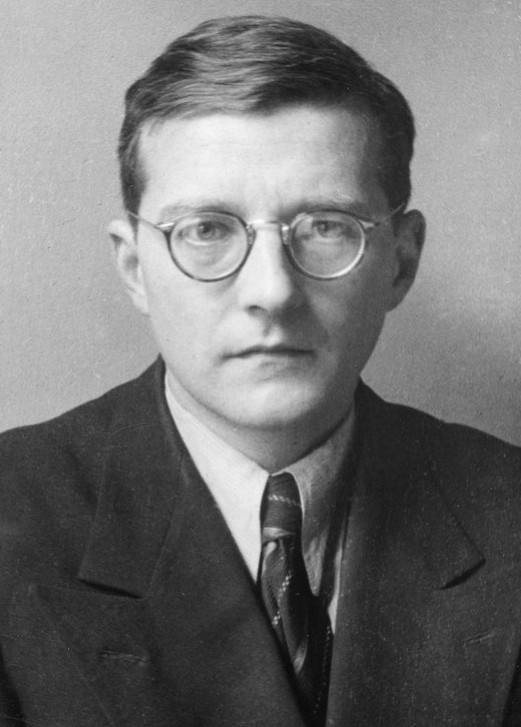
- Shostakovich in 1942
- Key: B minor
- Opus: 61
- Composed: 1943
- Dedication: Leonid Nikolayev
- Duration: 25 minutes
- Movements: 3

Premiere
- Date: June 6, 1943
- Location: Moscow
- Performers: Dmitri Shostakovich

The Piano Sonata No. 2 in B minor, Op. 61 by Dmitri Shostakovich, the last of his piano sonatas, was composed in early 1943. It was his first solo piano composition since 1933, as well as his second attempt at composing a piano sonata in the key of B minor.

Shostakovich began composing the sonata while he and his family were evacuated in Kuybyshev (present-day Samara). A few months before, he heard about the death of his former piano teacher Leonid Nikolayev, which affected him profoundly; the sonata is dedicated to his memory. Originally, Shostakovich had planned a four-movement sonata in C♯ minor, but by March 1943 had abandoned that idea in favor of the work's final three-movement form. Shostakovich premiered the sonata in Moscow on June 6, 1943.

The sonata was received with mixed reviews. Ivan Sollertinsky felt it was one of the finest of all of Shostakovich's works. Emil Gilels, an important champion of the sonata, expressed disappointment and compared it unfavorably to Shostakovich's symphonies. Shostakovich himself was unsure of the work's quality; it was one of the few piano works from his maturity that he never recorded. Nevertheless, he told Inger Wikström in 1973 that he regarded the sonata as the most important of his piano works.

== Background ==
The Piano Sonata No. 2 was Shostakovich's first solo piano composition since the 24 Preludes, Op. 34 from 1933 and his second attempt at composing a piano sonata in the key of B minor.

In late 1942, Shostakovich and his family were living in the city of Kuybyshev (present-day Samara), where they had been evacuated by the Soviet government in order to escape the Nazi siege of Leningrad. That October, the composer learned about the death of his former piano professor Leonid Nikolayev, who had died in Tashkent earlier that month from typhoid fever. "I loved him greatly and it grieves me to think that I shall never see him again", Shostakovich wrote to Isaak Glikman. "I have thought much about his life and shall miss him sorely".

Shostakovich commenced work on his second piano sonata in January 1943; its composition was concurrent with his waning enthusiasm for work on the opera The Gamblers as well as his own bout with typhoid fever. Initially, he had envisioned a four-movement sonata in C♯ minor. Three pages of rough drafts labeled "Piano Sonata No. 2, Op. 63" detailing this eventually abandoned concept are extant; none of this material was used in the final version of the sonata. Shostakovich continued to maintain in a letter to Vissarion Shebalin dated February 22 that the sonata would be cast into four movements. Soon thereafter, Shostakovich played the first movement of the final draft for Lev Oborin, who approved of the music, but suggested some edits, which Shostakovich accepted. In a letter to Ivan Sollertinsky from March 1943, the composer claimed that the sonata was a symptom of his ongoing "graphomania" and that the score had been "nearly all" written down. On April 21, 1943, Shostakovich wrote to Glikman that he had just completed the Piano Sonata No. 2, which he dedicated to the memory of Nikolayev. He completed the final draft of the sonata on March 17 while recovering his health at a sanatorium in Arkhangelskoye.

== Music ==
The Piano Sonata No. 2 consists of three movements:

1. Allegretto
2. Largo
3. Moderato (con moto) — Allegretto con moto — Adagio — Moderato

A typical performance takes approximately 25 minutes.

The restless mood of the first movement is established by the running sixteenth notes which begin the sonata, leading to a melodic line which is a verbatim quote in retrograde of the opening motif of Shostakovich's Symphony No. 1. This is followed by the appearance of a march-like theme in E♭, accompanied by triads in the same key, before ebbing away into a chromatic closing subject. A fortissimo climax is capped by the combination of the movement's two main subjects, clashing against each other bitonally in B and E♭. Following this is the "Largo" second movement, which mixes ternary and rondo forms. Musicologist David Haas likened it to a waltz, while Sofia Moshevich said the movement forecasts the textures and moods of Shostakovich's late music. The finale begins with the statement of a thirty-measure theme which is then developed upon by nine variations; allusions to the compositions of Nikolayev, as well as to what would later become Shostakovich's musical monogram, appear. The final variation closes the sonata with a recollection of its opening.

== Premieres ==
Shostakovich premiered the sonata in Moscow on June 6, 1943, on the same program as the premiere of his Six Romances on Verses by British Poets. Efrem Flaks, who was Shostakovich's recital partner for the performance of the song cycle, remembered that the composer took unusual care in preparing his performance of the sonata; the concert was the first time he played the piano in public in Moscow since September 1942.

The Western radio premiere of the sonata was played by Vera Brodsky and broadcast on CBS on September 29, 1943. It was preceded by a private performance that afternoon for invited critics and musicians. That broadcast was followed by the Western concert premiere at Carnegie Hall on October 24 played by Brodsky. Her performance was part of a concert of Soviet music held under the auspices of the American Russian Institute, which sought to improve cultural relations between the United States and Soviet Union. It also included the Western premieres of three songs from the Six Romances on Verses by British Poets, sung by Alexander Kipnis. Donald Ogden Stewart was the master of ceremonies for the concert, whose audience included Andrey Gromyko.

== Reception ==
=== In the Soviet Union ===
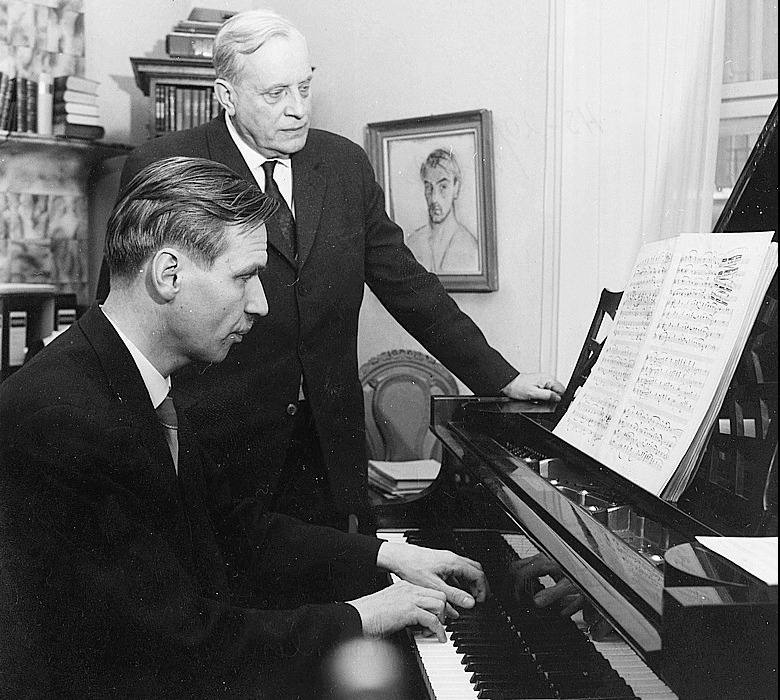
Erik Tawaststjerna (at the piano, 1962) heard and reported on Shostakovich's performance of the sonata at the 1947 Prague Spring Festival.

Critical reactions to the Piano Sonata No. 2 were slow to appear after its world premiere; those that did were mostly muted in their appreciation. Glikman heard Pavel Serebryakov play the Piano Sonata No. 2 in late 1943 in Moscow. He recalled that the music had made a "great impression" on him. Sollertinsky wrote privately in a letter marked November 1, 1943, that the sonata was "likely one of [Shostakovich's] best works (far superior to the rest of his piano music)". Nevertheless, in a letter to a friend dated June 14, 1944, Heinrich Neuhaus expressed mixed feelings:

Utmost mastery, novelty, intellect—empty for the soul and severe—clever and ancient—ancient sorrow consumes and oppresses. But like everything [Shostakovich] writes, it is unique of its kind and incomparable.

In 1947, Erik Tawaststjerna heard Shostakovich play the sonata at that year's Prague Spring Festival:

When Shostakovich began performing the figurations in the first movement, I remembered the descriptions of Mozart's murmuring non legato. The descending third of the main theme [of the first movement] was interpreted by him with a restrained melancholy, the majestic octave theme being tinged with the color of steel. Shostakovich's playing is rooted in a symphonic concept ... Until now, I have always perceived the "Andante" movement as being almost impressionistic. I was astounded by the sharpness of the thematic outlines in Shostakovich's interpretation. The melodic line [of the second movement] evolves in an endlessly subtle rubato. In the middle episode, one is amazed by his orchestral imagination—as if a solo flute, accompanied by lower strings, is heard playing ... And, ultimately, the theme of the Finale [appears]—single voiced, without supporting chord. Even now I can hear how Shostakovich [played it], as if measuring the varying levels of interval intensity.

Also in attendance at that performance were Emil Gilels and David Oistrakh. Although the latter noted that the performance was considered a success, the former confided to him that he did not think highly of the music. Nevertheless, Gilels declared in the press that the sonata was among the new "outstanding piano works" of the Soviet repertoire, but he also added that it "did not satisfy him" and that the sonata "testifie[d] more to Shostakovich's wonderful technique than to the depth of thought which was characteristic of his [recent] symphonies". His reservations notwithstanding, Gilels recorded the sonata for RCA Victor in 1965 and was considered an important exponent of it. Of Soviet pianists of the period, only Maria Yudina expressed her unreserved admiration for the sonata, which she immediately incorporated into her repertory.

During the Zhdanovschina, the Piano Sonata No. 2 was among those works by Shostakovich which were censured by the Union of Soviet Composers.

=== In the United States ===
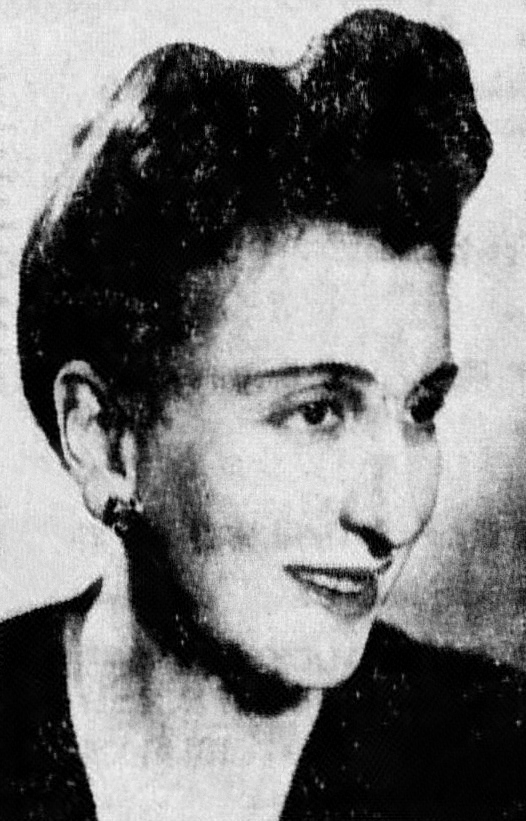
Vera Brodsky in 1943

The Piano Sonata No. 2 was premiered in the United States and the United Kingdom in September 1943. Vera Brodsky played the premiere stateside, with a performance broadcast by CBS on September 29, followed by a live concert performance on October 24. The manuscript score had been flown to her via from the Soviet Union.

Alma Lubin, music critic of the Cincinnati Enquirer, recorded that the unusual amount of attention accorded to the sonata had less to do with its intrinsic worth than with historic circumstances of the day:

[O]f course, this kind of treatment to a new work is hardly typical. For, granted the sonata is a splendid and deserving modern composition, its journalistic appeal no doubt largely stems from the fact that its composer's Seventh Symphony recently had its dramatic and sensational career. From Shostakovich writing it in Leningrad under fire, all the way to Toscanini conducting the premiere, that symphony had more news value than any other single musical composition of modern history.

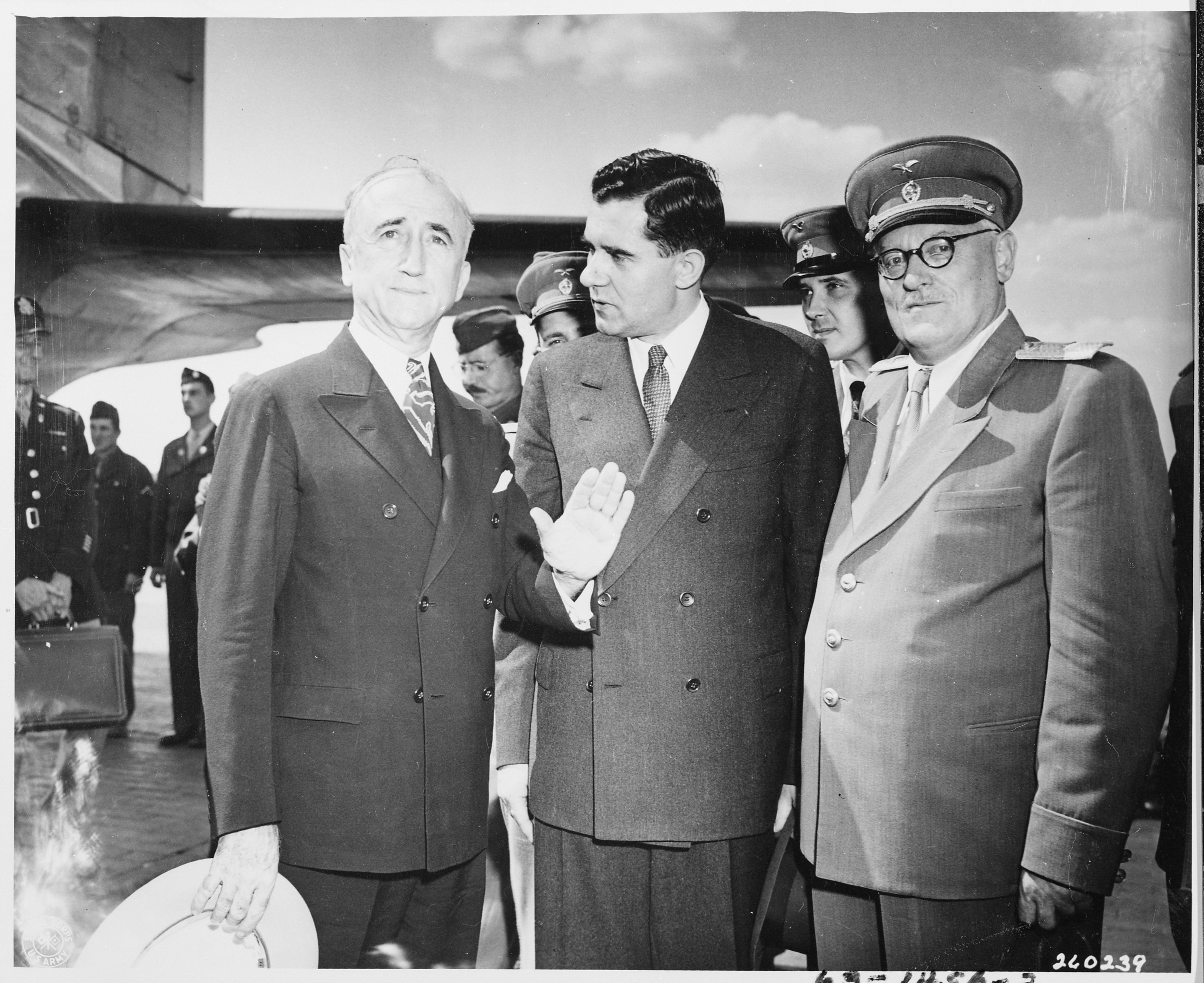
Andrei Gromyko (center, in 1945) attended the American concert premiere of the sonata at Carnegie Hall.

Reviews following Brodsky's broadcast and later performance at Carnegie Hall, the latter held under the auspices of the American Russian Institute, were mixed. Miles Kastendieck of the Brooklyn Daily Eagle praised her performance, but said that it was "hard to perceive much beauty on a first hearing" of the sonata, and suggested reinforcing the piano with more instruments as he felt that its "austere style called for more sustaining of sound that the piano could give". Noel Straus of the New York Times gave the sonata a positive appraisal:

[It] begins with a lengthy march-like "Allegretto" movement, in which the thematic material is of a virile nature, easily assimilated, sharply defined, and expertly developed. The "Largo" sounded forced and manufactured at first hearing. But the final "Allegro", a set of free variations of a passacaglia effect, proved masterly in its inventiveness and led, toward the end, to a brooding variant built up over the first two notes of the theme that brought the work to an extremely impressive close.

=== Later appraisals ===
Writing nearly 40 years after the Piano Sonata No. 2's composition, Lev Danilevich eulogized it as a significant development in Shostakovich's piano writing, taking especial note of its "anti-virtuosic" austerity of texture. John Jonas Gruen said that there was "nothing obscure or technically impenetrable" about the sonata, but that "something disquieting—something faintly obsessive—emerges from its deceptively simple structure".

=== Shostakovich's personal opinion ===
Shostakovich's feelings about the sonata changed over the years. It was one of the few piano works from his artistic maturity which he did not record himself. In May 1943, shortly after Shostakovich completed the sonata, he met with Marietta Shaginyan. Notwithstanding that he made a present to her of two pages from the sonata manuscript, he dismissed it to her as a "trifle, something impromptu", and that he was "pulled" to wanting to write an Eighth Symphony instead. Nevertheless, he told Inger Wikström during a meeting in Copenhagen in early 1973 that he esteemed the Piano Sonata No. 2 as the most important of his piano works.

== Sources ==
- Fay, Laurel (2000). Shostakovich: A Life. Oxford: Oxford University Press. ISBN 0-19-513438-9.
- Glikman, Isaak (2001). Story of a Friendship: The Letters of Dmitry Shostakovich to Isaak Glikman, 1941–1975. Ithaca, New York: Cornell University Press. ISBN 0-8014-3979-5.
- Khentova, Sofia (1985). Шостакович. Жизнь и творчество (in Russian). Vol. 2. Moscow: Советский композитор.
- Mishra, Michael (2008). Mishra, Michael (ed.). A Shostakovich Companion. Westport, Connecticut: Praeger Publishers. ISBN 978-0-313-30503-0.
- Moshevich, Sofia (2004). Dmitri Shostakovich, Pianist. Montreal/Kingston: McGill-Queen's University Press. ISBN 0-7735-2581-5.
- Moshevich, Sofia (2015). Shostakovich's Music for Piano Solo Interpretation and Performance. Bloomington/Indianapolis: Indiana University Press. ISBN 978-0-253-01422-1.
- Yakubov, Manashir (January 2001). "Documentary: Inside the Second Piano Sonata". DSCH Journal. 14.
