= Yoon Kwon =

South Korean musician

- Born: Seoul, South Korea
- Education: Juilliard School
- Occupation(s): Violinist, pedagogue
- Website: yoonkwon.com

Yoon Kwon is a South Korean-born American violinist and member of the first violins section of the Metropolitan Opera Orchestra.

== Life and career ==
Born in Seoul, South Korea, Kwon began her studies at the age of three, initially studying piano under the tutelage of her mother. At the age of six, she began studying violin, was quickly recognized as a Child prodigy and was accepted into Juilliard two years later at the age of 8. There, she studied with Dorothy DeLay. In 1997, she was the youngest winner of the Juilliard School Concerto Competition, which resulted in her Avery Fisher Hall, Lincoln Center debut that year. After also studying with Hyo Kang, Cho-Liang Lin, and Donald Weilerstein, she received her Bachelor and Master of Music degrees as well as the Artist Diploma from Juilliard.

Kwon's career began in 1993 as a thirteen-year-old when she won the New Jersey Symphony Young Artists Auditions and joined the roster of IMG Artists. In 1997, she released her debut CD on the RCA Victor Red Seal label in Korea.

Since her debut CD release, Kwon has gone on to perform extensively around the world. Since 2005 she has played in the first violin section of the Metropolitan Opera Orchestra, while working with other ensembles, including the quintet Off The Score with Police drummer Stewart Copeland, and Jon Kimura Parker.

Kwon has performed extensively with her pianist sister Min Kwon. The duo recorded a record for RCA Victor Red Seal entitled You And Me. She is a founding member of the ensemble Emergence along with Patrick Zimmerli. As of 2014, she began working with the ensemble Off The Score.

== Pedagogy ==
Kwon has taught at Columbia University's Young Musicians Program, Kuhmo International Music Course in Finland, and as an assistant to Cho-Liang Lin, at the Juilliard School. She is on the faculty of the Mason Gross School of the Arts at Rutgers University where she teaches violin.

== Instruments ==
Kwon has been the recipient of the Avery Fisher Stradivarius on loan from the Juilliard School and the Sennhouser Guarnerius del Gesu on loan from the Stradivari Society.

== Awards ==
- New Jersey Symphony Young Artists Auditions: First place
- Juilliard Concerto Competition: First place

== Discography ==
- You And Me (With Min Kwon), BMG/RCA Red Label, 2000
- Phoenix – Patrick Zimmerli, 2005
- Love Is Dead – Kerli, 2008 – (Violin)
- Duets II – Tony Bennett, 2011 – (Violin)
- Cheek to Cheek – Tony Bennett and Lady Gaga, 2014 – (Violin)
