= Haewon Song =

South Korean pianist and pedagogue

Haewon Song is a South Korean pianist and pedagogue who was awarded many prizes at the World and Oberlin International Piano Competitions as well as Music Teachers National Association award. She used to give lessons in France, Germany, Japan, Taiwan, and her native Korea. As a soloist she performed at the Baltimore Symphony Orchestra and Cleveland Chamber Symphony and was a participant of the Festival Internacional Cervantino, and both Oberlin and Grand Teton Music Festivals. She is a graduate of Toho Gakuen School of Music and Juilliard School where she was under guidance from Shuku Iwasaki, Julian Martin, and Martin Canin. Currently she works as a teacher at both Tunghai and Kyung Won Universities in the capital of South Korea. She is married to Robert Shannon who works at the Oberlin Conservatory of Music and together they issue albums under Bridge Records label.
