= Joel Fan =

American classical pianist (born 1969)

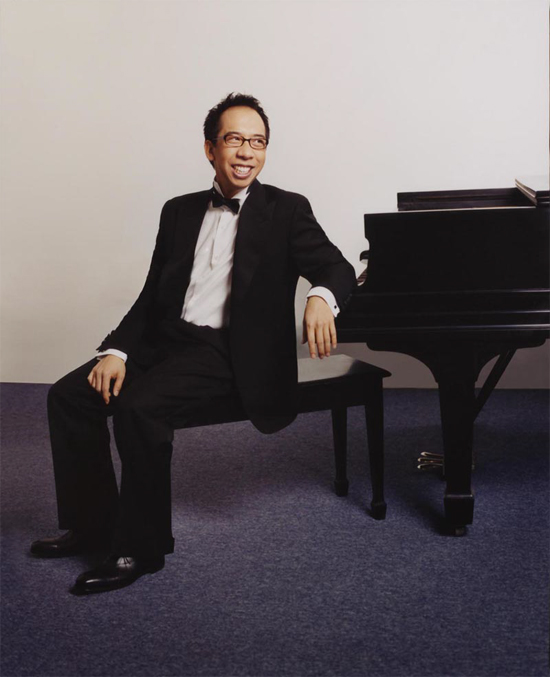
- Born: July 29, 1969 (age 57); New York City, U.S.
- Occupation: Pianist
- Musical career
- Genre: Classical
- Website: joelfanmusic.com

Joel Fan (born July 29, 1969) is an American classical pianist and Steinway artist. He had two consecutive Billboard Top 10 Debuts with his solo CDs World Keys and West of the Sun, while Dances for Piano and Orchestra earned a Grammy Award nomination.

== Early life and education ==
Joel Fan was born in New York City to Taiwanese American immigrant parents. While attending Hunter College High School, he studied at the Pre-College Division of the Juilliard School as a student of Kathryn Parker and Martin Canin. Fan made his debut playing with the New York Philharmonic after winning the orchestra's Young People's Concert Auditions at the age of 11.

Fan graduated with a bachelor's degree from Harvard University, where his teachers included the composer Leon Kirchner. He then earned a Master of Music degree in piano from the Peabody Institute of Johns Hopkins University, where he studied with Leon Fleisher. He is a prize winner of the Busoni International Piano Competition in Italy, Kosciuzko Foundation's Chopin Prize, and named a Presidential Scholar by the National Foundation for Advancement in the Arts.

== Career ==
Joel Fan has performed as a soloist with over 40 different concertos from the traditional classical repertoire, as well as works such as Messiaen Turangalila Symphony, Szymanowski Symphony-Concertante No. 4, and Bernstein's Age of Anxiety. He has appeared as a soloist with the New York Philharmonic, Boston Pops Orchestra, Royal Stockholm Philharmonic, Singapore Symphony, Odesa Philharmonic, and London Sinfonietta. He has collaborated with various conductors like Keith Lockhart, David Zinman, Alan Gilbert, Zubin Mehta, David Robertson and others.

Fan was solo recitalist at the Kennedy Center, the Ravinia Festival, Jordan Hall, Calgary Celebrity Series, the Metropolitan Museum of Art, and the National Gallery of Art in Washington D.C. His recital performances have received praised for their composition and energetic tones.

== Silk Road Ensemble ==
In 1998, cellist Yo-Yo Ma established the Silk Road Ensemble. As a member, Fan's performances appear on their first album, Silk Road Journeys (2001) and with the ensemble in their initial tour of China and their concerts at the Kennedy Center later that year. His history of performances with Yo-Yo Ma and the Silk Road Ensemble include concert venues such as Carnegie Hall, the Kennedy Center, the Concertgebouw, and television programs such as Good Morning America. Along with Yo-Yo Ma, Wu Man on pipa, and Wu Tong on sheng, Fan also performed premieres such as Bright Sheng's concerto The Song and Dance of Tears with the London Sinfonietta at the BBC Proms. Fan is noted for his work with Yo-Yo Ma, performing repertoire that includes works drawn from the traditional cello repertoire, contemporary works, the music of cultures outside the classical tradition, and in performances of traditional chamber music and Beethoven's Triple Concerto.

== Recordings and albums ==
His albums have scored two consecutive Billboard Top 10 Debuts and a Grammy nomination. His music airs on radio on stations such as WQXR in New York City and WCLV in Cleveland among many others. Fan's live performances and interviews are also featured in broadcasts on radio stations including KING in Seattle, and Houston Public Media.

Fan recorded his debut solo piano recital album for Reference Recordings, World Keys: Virtuoso Piano Music. Featuring ten composers from ten different countries, the album combines pieces from the Classical tradition by Prokofiev, Liszt and Schumann, with five world premieres from international composers: Dia Succari (Syria), Halim El-Dabh (Egypt), Qigang Chen (China), Peteris Vasks (Latvia) and A. Adman Saygun (Turkey). The album debuted at No.3 on the Billboard Charts.

His second album, West of the Sun, featured songs from nine composers from North and South America, including Latin inspired compositions and work from Black American composer Margaret Bonds among others. His fourth album, Dances for Piano and Orchestra, collected a range of pieces from different global piano and dance traditions. The tracks on Dances ranged in genre from Classic works such as Chopin to more modern dance music from Charles Cadman's Dark Dancers of the Mardi Gras.

Fan's third album, Revelation, was dedicated to his mentor Leon Kirchner, and focused on highlighting Fan's favourite pieces from Kirchner's repertoire.

Joel Fan has recorded for Reference Recordings, Sony Classical, Verdant World Records, and Albany Records.

== Awards and critical acclaim ==
Fan has been awarded by the D’Anglo Young Artists International Competition and Busoni International Piano Competition. He was the winner of the Kosciuzko Foundation's Chopin Prize and named a Presidential Scholar by the National Foundation for Advancement in the Arts.

Joel Fan is a Steinway Artist.
