= Madeleine Forte =

French-American pianist

Madeleine (Hsu) Forte
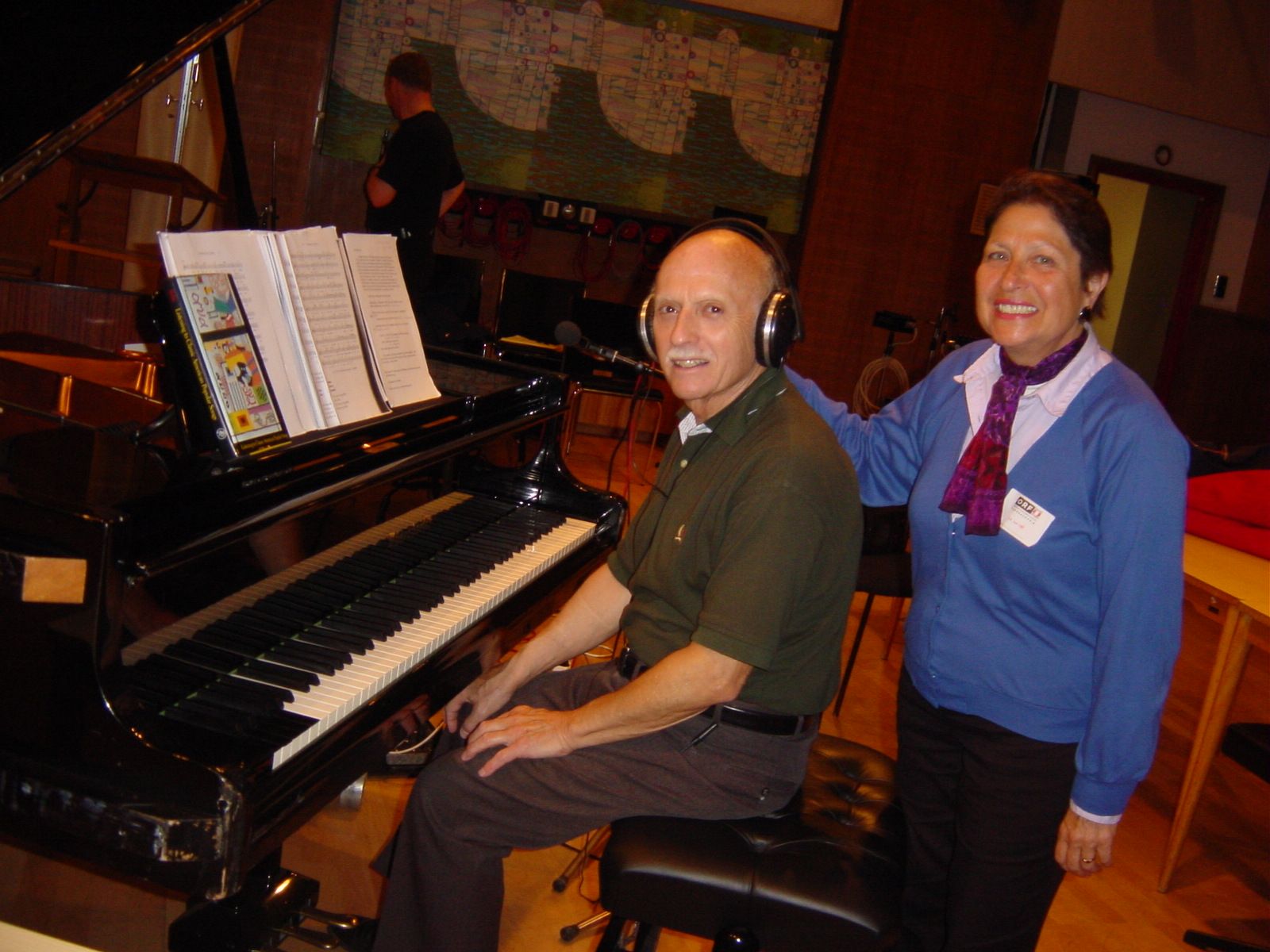
- Allen and Madeleine Forte at the Vienna Radio, 2002.
- Born: 20 September 1938 (age 88)
- Occupation: Classical pianist
- Years active: 1951–present
- Spouse: Allen Forte
- Website: madeleineforte.github.io

Madeleine (Hsu) Forte (born 20 September 1938) is a Franco-American pianist, recording artist, and Professor Emerita of Piano at the Morrison Center for the Performing Arts at Boise State University.

== Early life and education ==
Madeleine Forte began her career at a Beethoven festival in Vichy, France. She first studied piano with her aunt, then with master pianists Alfred Cortot and Wilhelm Kempff. She has won prizes in international competitions (Viotti, Italy; Maria Canals, Spain; Guanabara, Brazil). She holds a Musicology Diploma from the École Normale de Musique de Paris in the class of Norbert Dufourcq, Artist Diplomas from the Ecole Normale and the Warsaw Conservatory in the class of Zbigniew Drzewiecki, and bachelor's and master's degrees from The Juilliard School, where she studied with Rosina Lhévinne and Martin Canin. In 1970, she received the "Josef Lhevinne Memorial Award" in New York that granted a full scholarship to complete her master's at Juilliard. She became a United States immigrant and an American Citizen in January 1976. In 1996 she was a Yale University Visiting Hendon Fellow. In 1984, she received the Ph.D. degree from New York University with a dissertation on the music of Olivier Messiaen. She is a recipient of the Master Teacher Certificate, Music Teachers National Association. The Madeleine Hsu Forte Piano scholarship is offered on a yearly basis to a gifted piano student at Boise State University.

== Recording and performing ==
Madeleine Forte has appeared as a recording artist on Radiodiffusion-television française in Paris, on Radio Warsaw, on Television O Globo, Rio-de-Janeiro, Radio Television Buenos Aires, and NBC Television, New York. Her compact disc recordings of the music of Albéniz, Arensky, Barber, Bartók, Beethoven, Bizet, Busoni Chabrier, Chopin, Debussy, Falla, Glière, Khachaturian, Liszt, Manuel Infante, Messiaen, Poulenc, Rachmaninoff, Ravel, and Saint-Saëns are distributed worldwide. She has presented solo recitals and has performed as a soloist with orchestras in France, Italy, Spain, Switzerland, Belgium, Poland, Estonia, Hungary, Brazil, Argentina, Uruguay, Austria, England, Norway, the United States, Canada, China, Japan, and South Korea. She is a founding member of The Bel-Être Ensemble and the Lillibridge Ensemble.

== Personal life ==
Forte is the widow of Allen Forte, American music theorist and musicologist. She has two sons Yann and Olen, and two grandchildren, Olivier Guillaume and Elodie Marie.

== Discography ==
Year of issue	Album details	Record label
1998	Maurice Ravel Sonatine / Miroirs / Pavane / Gaspard De La Nuit / Jeux d'eau	Connoisseur Society
1999	Frédéric Chopin Polonaise-Fantaisie / Sonata in B minor / Four Scherzi	Connoisseur Society
2001	Madeleine Forte Plays Messiaen	Roméo Records
2001	Claude Debussy, Images / Pour Le Piano / L'isle Joyeuse	Connoisseur Society
2002	Chopin Played by Madeleine Forte (recorded on the Érard Piano, Paris 1881)	Roméo Records
2003	Barber, Bartók, Liszt, Beethoven: Piano Works Performed Live by Madeleine Forte	Roméo Records
2005	The Skula/Forte Duo, Live at Whitney Center, with Mariusz Skula, cello	Self-released
2006	A Celebration of Duo-Piano Music, with Del Parkinson (3 CDs: Spanish, French, and Russian programs)	Roméo Records
2006	Fauré & Brahms Violin Sonatas, with James Greening-Valenzuela, violin	Con Brio Recordings
2022	Madeleine Forte and István Nádas, Duo Pianists: Historic Live Performance 1980 — Works by Debussy, Mozart, Schubert, J.S. Bach	Roméo Records
2022	Madeleine Forte & Del Parkinson, Duo Pianists, Live 1993 — Works by Leo Weiner, Béla Bartók, Franz Liszt	Roméo Records
2025	The Lillibridge Ensemble: International Piano Festival — Works by de Falla, Bengtson, Rachmaninov, Liszt, Brahms, Dvořák; with Jánós Kéry and Ildikó Bartha, pianists	Roméo Records
2026	The Lillibridge Ensemble: Sonatas for Violin and Piano by Schumann, Franck, and Fauré, with Raphael Ryger, violin	Roméo Records
2026	The Lillibridge Ensemble: Sonatas for Violin and Piano by Beethoven and Debussy, with Raphael Ryger, violin	Roméo Records
2026	A Little Practice in My Home — Solo piano works by Bach, Scarlatti, Chopin, and Liszt	Roméo Records
2026	The Lillibridge Ensemble / The Bel-Être Duo: Schumann & Chopin — Schumann: Piano Quintet, Op. 44; Chopin: Cello Sonata, Op. 65	Roméo Records
2026	The Lillibridge Ensemble: Forte & Parkinson, Duo Pianists — Works by Schubert, Mozart, Liszt, Rachmaninoff (live recordings, 1986 & 1988), with Del Parkinson, piano	Roméo Records
2026	Greening-Valenzuela & Forte: Smetana / Ravel / Beethoven, with James Greening-Valenzuela, violin	Roméo Records
2026	The Lillibridge Ensemble: Brahms Three Violin Sonatas, with Raphael Ryger, violin	Roméo Records
