= Annette Volkamer =

German classical pianist

Annette Volkamer is a German pianist.

== Life and career ==
Born in Freiburg im Breisgau, Volkamer studied at the Hochschule für Musik und Darstellende Kunst Mannheim with Paul Dan and Robert Benz as well as at the University of Music and Performing Arts Vienna with Hans Petermandl and at the Juilliard School of Music with Martin Canin. She also attended master classes with Karl-Heinz Kämmerling, Rudolf Kehrer, Michael Ponti, Yevgeny Malinin, Pavel Gililov and Hans Leygraf. In 1998, she won the first medal at the International Piano Competition Maria Canals de Barcelona.

She has participated in radio recordings of the WDR and the SWR and worked with orchestras such as the Konzerthausorchester Berlin, the Staatsphilharmonie Rheinland-Pfalz, the Staatsphilharmonie Krakow, the Philharmonia Hungarica and "I Solisti di Praha". As a soloist, she has performed at venues including the Prinzregententheater Munich, the Konzerthaus Berlin, the Festspielhaus Lucerne, the Romanian Athenaeum and the Krakow State Opera. With the actor Charles Brauer, she created the soiree Beethoven and the Women.

Since 2000, Volkamer has been a lecturer for piano at the Mannheim University of Music and Performing Arts.

== Concert critics ==
Powerful, unsophisticated, straightforward, Annette Volkamer mastered the solo part of the fourth piano concerto as the ideal keyboard partner of the Kapellmeister. Both interpreted it as an image of a rugged landscape of the soul, as an excitingly modern, groundbreakingly antithetical composition: no contrast was smoothed out, every syncopation, every sforzato was uncompromisingly savoured, the moods changed abruptly.

— Soester Anzeiger, 22 February 1999, L. v. Beethoven "Leonore III", "Piano Concerto No. 4", "Symphony No. 4" Philharmonic State Orchestra Halle, Annette Volkamer

In Springe, pianist Annette Volkamer presented a mostly handsome composer with soulfully tender touches. The person behind the music was made visible by the recited texts Neue Deister-Zeitung, 8 March 2005

.

== Publications ==
- CD: Leopold Kozeluch – Musik in seltener Solobesetzung RBM (RBM 463 076)
