= Allen Forte =

American musicologist

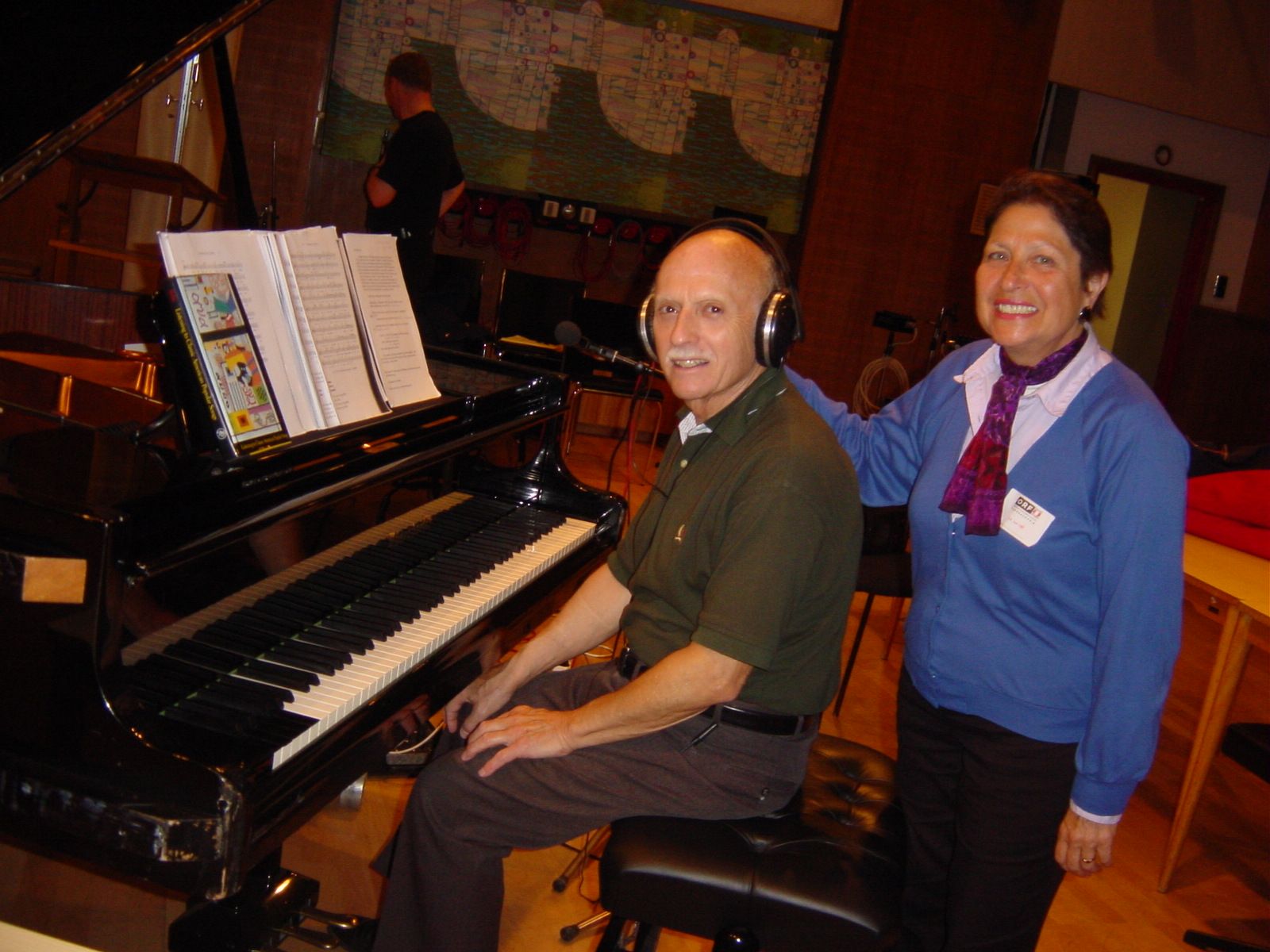
- Title: Battell Professor Emeritus of the Theory of Music, Yale University
- Spouse: Madeleine Forte
- Awards: Guggenheim Fellow

Academic background
- Education: Columbia University

Academic work
- Discipline: Music Theory
- Sub-discipline: 20th-century atonal music and music analysis
- Institutions: Yale University; Columbia University

Allen Forte (December 23, 1926 – October 16, 2014) was an American music theorist and musicologist. He was Battell Professor Emeritus of the Theory of Music at Yale University and specialized in 20th-century atonal music and music analysis.

== Early life and education ==
Forte was born in Portland, Oregon. At the age of ten he appeared "on a [local] radio show as a solo pianist among a bevy of similarly youthful performers," where he played the music of Cole Porter and others. He was in the US Navy and served in the Pacific Theatre toward the end of World War II.

Afterwards, he relocated to New York City to study music at Columbia University where he received his bachelor's and master's degrees. There, he studied composition with Otto Luening and Vladimir Ussachevsky, although his main interests were forming around music theory and analysis.

== Academic career ==
In the late 1950s, Forte taught music at various New York institutions: Columbia University Teachers College, Manhattan School of Music, and Mannes College of Music. In fall 1959 he began his long-term appointment at Yale, where he eventually became the Battell Professor of Music (retiring in 2003). He was influential there as both scholar and teacher, and in the latter capacity served as adviser to seventy-two Ph.D. dissertations completed between 1968 and 2002. (Yale did not offer a Ph.D. in theory for the first several years Forte was there.) A list of all his advisees and their dissertation titles appears in David Carson Berry, "The Twin Legacies of a Scholar-Teacher: The Publications and Dissertation Advisees of Allen Forte," Gamut 2/1 (2009), 197-222. The list is ordered chronologically by submission, and each advisee is given an "FA" number to denote his or her ordering among the advisees. ("FA" stands for "Forte Advisee," and is also a retrograde of Allen Forte's initials.)

Forte taught at the Massachusetts Institute of Technology from 1967 to 1968 on integrating music theory with computer systems. He was also a visiting music professor at Harvard University in 2008.

== Publications ==
Forte is well known for his book The Structure of Atonal Music (1973), which traces many of its roots to an article of a decade earlier: "A Theory of Set-Complexes for Music" (1964). In these works, he "applied set-theoretic principles to the analysis of unordered collections of pitch classes, called pitch-class sets (pc sets). [...] The basic goal of Forte's theory was to define the various relationships that existed among the relevant sets of a work, so that contextual coherence could be demonstrated." Although the methodology derived from Forte's work "has had its detractors ... textbooks on post-tonal analysis now routinely teach it (to varying degrees)."

Forte published analyses of the works of Webern and Berg and wrote about Schenkerian analysis and music of the Great American Songbook. A complete, annotated bibliography of his publications appears in the previously cited article, Berry, "The Twin Legacies of a Scholar-Teacher." Excluding items for which Forte was only an editor, it lists ten books, sixty-three articles, and thirty-six other types publications, from 1955 through early 2009.

Forte was also the editor of the Journal of Music Theory during an important period in its development, from volume 4/2 (1960) through 11/1 (1967). His involvement with the journal, including many biographical details, is addressed in David Carson Berry, "Journal of Music Theory under Allen Forte's Editorship," Journal of Music Theory 50/1 (2006): 7-23.

== Honors and awards ==
He has been honored by two Festschriften (homage volumes). The first, in commemoration of his seventieth birthday, was published in 1997 and edited by his former students James M. Baker, David W. Beach, and Jonathan W. Bernard (FA12, FA6, and FA11, according to Berry's list). It was titled Music Theory in Concept and Practice (a title derived from Forte's 1962 undergraduate textbook, Tonal Harmony in Concept and Practice). The second was serialized in five installments of Gamut: The Journal of the Music Theory Society of the Mid-Atlantic, between 2009 and 2013. It was edited by Forte's former student David Carson Berry (FA72) and was titled A Music-Theoretical Matrix: Essays in Honor of Allen Forte (a title derived from Forte's 1961 monograph, A Compositional Matrix). It included twenty-two articles by Forte's former doctoral advisees, and three special features: a previously unpublished article by Forte, on Gershwin songs; a collection of tributes and reminiscences from forty-two of his former advisees; and an annotated register of his publications and advisees.

== Personal life ==
Forte was married to Herta Lynd Waitzfelder Sharland (1915–2000), and later to the French-born pianist Madeleine (Hsu) Forte, emerita professor of piano at Boise State University.

== Bibliography (Books and seminal articles) ==
- (1955) Contemporary Tone-Structures. New York: Bureau of Publications, Columbia Univ. Teachers College.
- (1959) "Schenker's Conception of Musical Structure," Journal of Music Theory, iii, 1–30.
- (1961) The Compositional Matrix. Baldwin, NY: Music Teachers National Assoc.
- (1962) Tonal Harmony in Concept and Practice (3rd ed., 1979). New York: Holt, Rinehart and Winston.
- (1967) SNOBOL3 Primer: An Introduction to the Computer Programming Language. Cambridge, MA: MIT Press.
- (1970) Musicology and the computer : musicology 1966-2000: a practical program : three symposia American Musicological Society, Greater New York Chapter 1965-1966 (with Barry S Brook) New York: City Univ. of New York Press.
- (1973) The Structure of Atonal Music. New Haven: Yale Univ. Press.
- (1978) The Harmonic Organization of The Rite of Spring. New Haven: Yale Univ. Press.
- (1978) "Schoenberg's Creative Evolution: the Path to Atonality," The Musical Quarterly, lxiv, 133–76.
- (1980) "Generative Chromaticism in Mozart's Music," The Musical Quarterly, lxvi, 459–83.
- (1982) Introduction to Schenkerian Analysis (with Steven E. Gilbert). New York: W. W. Norton.
- (1984) "Middleground Motives in the Adagietto of Mahler's Fifth Symphony," 19th-Century Music, viii, 153–63.
- (1985) "Tonality, Symbol, and Structural Levels in Berg's Wozzeck," The Musical Quarterly, lxxi, 474–99.
- (1987) "Liszt's Experimental Music and Music of the Early Twentieth Century," 19th-Century Music, x, 209–28; repr. as "Liszt's Experimental Idiom and Twentieth-Century Music," Music at the Turn of the Century, ed. J. Kerman (Berkeley, 1990), 93–114.
- (1988) "New Approaches to the Linear Analysis of Music," Journal of the American Musicological Society, xli, 315–48.
- (1988) "Pitch-Class Set Genera and the Origin of Modern Harmonic Species," Journal of Music Theory, xxxii, 187–270.
- (1990) "Musorgsky as Modernist: the Phantasmic Episode from Boris Godunov," Music Analysis, ix, 1–42.
- (1991) "Debussy and the Octatonic," Music Analysis, x, 125–69.
- (1991) "The Mask of Tonality: Alban Berg's Symphonic Epilogue to Wozzeck," Alban Berg: Analytical and Historical Perspectives, ed. D. Gable and R.P. Morgan, Oxford: Oxford Univ. Press, 151–200.
- (1992) "Concepts of Linearity in Schoenberg's Atonal Music: a Study of the Opus 15 Song Cycle," Journal of Music Theory, xxxvi, 285–382.
- (1993) "Foreground Rhythm in Early Twentieth-Century Music," Early Twentieth-Century Music, ed. J. Dunsby Oxford: Oxford Univ. Press, 132–47.
- (1995) The American Popular Ballad of the Golden Era: 1924-1950. Princeton: Princeton Univ. Press.
- (1996) "The Golden Thread: Octatonic Music in Webern's Early Songs," Webern Studies, ed. K. Bailey, Cambridge: Cambridge Univ. Press, 74–110.
- (1998) The Atonal Music of Anton Webern. New Haven: Yale Univ. Press.
- (2001) Listening to Classic American Popular Songs. New Haven: Yale Univ. Press.
- (2009) "Schoenberg as Webern: The Three Pieces for Chamber Orchestra: III (1910)," Schoenberg's Chamber Music, Schoenberg's World , ed. James K. Wright and Alan Gillmor, Hillsdale, NY: Pendragon Press, 55–64.

== See also ==
- Forte number
