= Vera Brodsky Lawrence =

American musician (1909–1996)

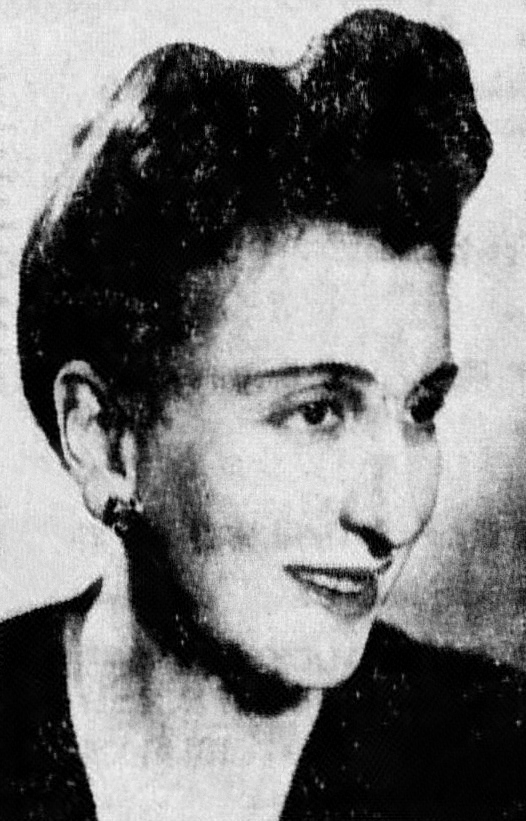
- Publicity photo of Brodsky Lawrence, 1943
- Born: Vera Rebecca Brodsky; July 1, 1909; Norfolk, Virginia, US
- Died: September 18, 1996 (aged 87); New York City, US
- Education: Juilliard School of Music
- Occupations: Pianist; musicologist; teacher
- Organizations: Curtis Institute of Music; Juilliard School of Music
- Spouse: Theodore Lawrence (m. 1944; died 1964)
- Awards: ASCAP Deems Taylor Award (1976)

Vera Brodsky Lawrence (born Vera Rebecca Brodsky; July 1, 1909 – September 18, 1996) was an American pianist, music historian, and editor. A child prodigy, she left her native Virginia to enroll at the Juilliard School of Music in New York City, where she studied with Josef and Rosina Lhévinne. After graduating, she traveled to Europe where she met Harold Triggs in 1932 and formed a piano duo that played classical music and arrangements of popular music of the era.

In 1938, she became a staff pianist for CBS and embarked on a solo career. Aside from performing live solo recitals, song recital accompaniments, and chamber music, she was the host of a weekly radio show where she played modern and lesser-known compositions. During World War II, she played the Western broadcast and concert premieres of Dmitri Shostakovich's Piano Sonata No. 2, and had exclusive performing rights to it for a period. She also gave the Western broadcast premieres of Sergei Prokofiev's Piano Sonata No. 8 and an excerpt from his opera War and Peace.

The death of her husband in an automobile accident in 1964 compelled her to abandon her career as a pianist, destroy her personal documents, and become a musicologist. She edited the complete works of Louis Moreau Gottschalk, the first edition of its kind for any American composer, and the collected works of Scott Joplin, becoming a crucial figure in the revivals of their music. She co-edited the score of the latter's opera Treemonisha and was the artistic consultant for its successful performance at the Houston Grand Opera in 1976.

Her final years were spent writing an overview of early American musical culture and a three-volume survey of musical life in 19th-century New York City based on the diaries of George Templeton Strong. The final volume was left just short of completion when she died in 1996.

== Biography ==
=== Early life ===
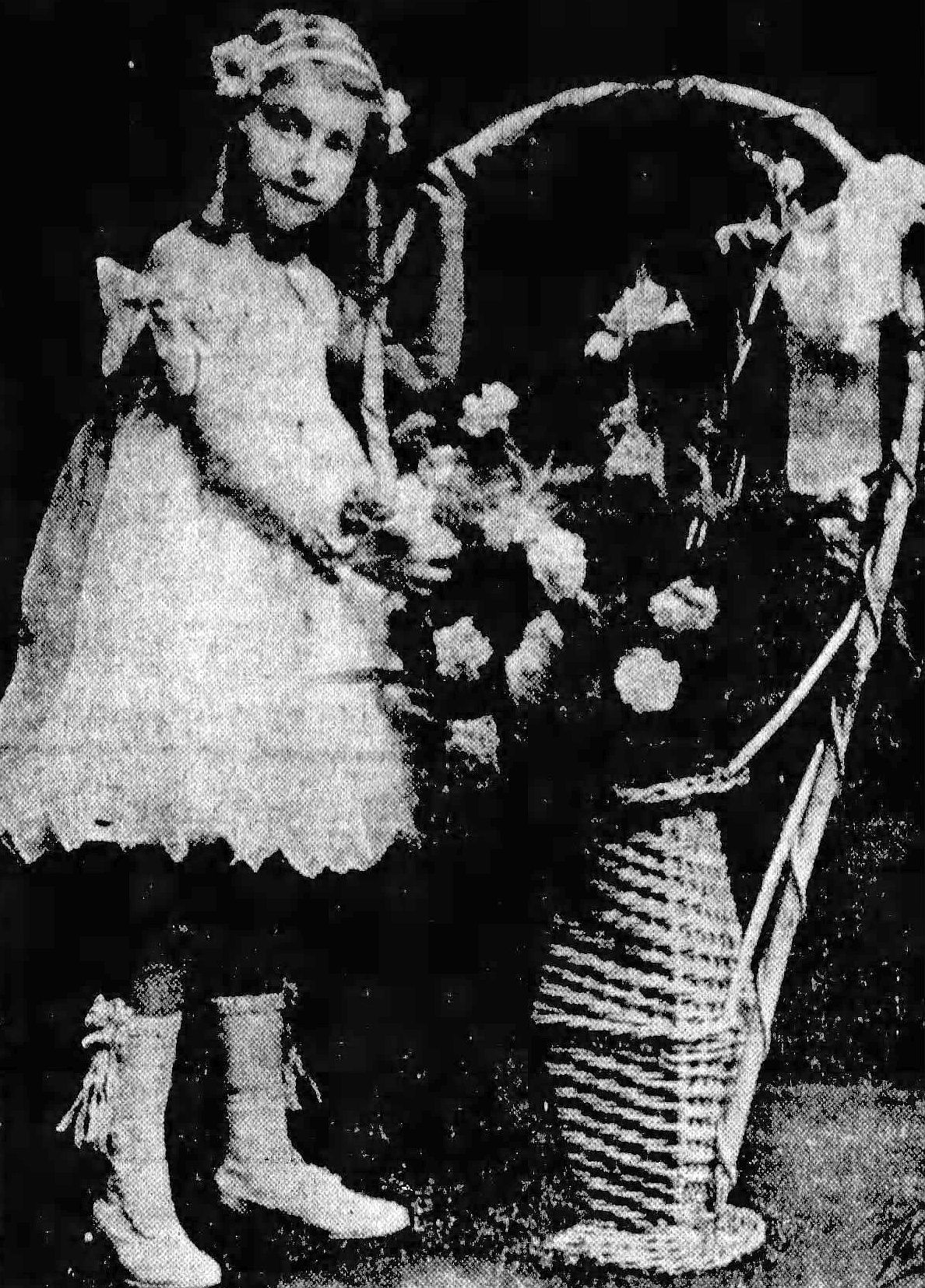
Brodsky Lawrence at age 7 in 1916

Brodsky Lawrence was born in Norfolk, Virginia, on July 1, 1909. Her parents, Simon and Rose (Segal) Brodsky, were Jewish immigrants from Congress Poland. She attended Norfolk Grammar School in her childhood, during which she began taking piano lessons with J.J. Miller. By age seven her pianistic skill drew the notice of the local press:

In little Miss Brodsky ... Norfolk has a musical prodigy. The child, by remarkable renditions of difficult music ... surprised her friends and even her teacher. The little friends predict for her a brilliant future in the musical world.

She subsequently moved to New York City with her family, where she attended the Juilliard School of Music on a scholarship, and performed at Steinway Hall. She studied piano at Juilliard with Josef and Rosina Lhévinne. In 1930, Brodsky Lawrence traveled to Vienna for further piano studies, after which she performed recitals across Europe.

=== Brodsky and Triggs ===
In 1932, Brodsky Lawrence met Harold Triggs in Salzburg. Soon thereafter they began touring as a piano duo, performing repertoire that included classical music and arrangements of popular music of the era. Among the musicians they performed with were the New York Philharmonic-Symphony Orchestra, as well as the orchestras of Paul Whiteman, Fred Waring, and Mark Warnow. Abram Chasins composed his Carmen Fantasy for them, which he also dedicated. During this period, Brodsky Lawrence and Triggs taught piano duo performance at Juilliard and the Curtis Institute of Music. Their partnership ended by the end of the 1930s, but she continued to perform Triggs' music in her solo programs.

=== Solo career ===
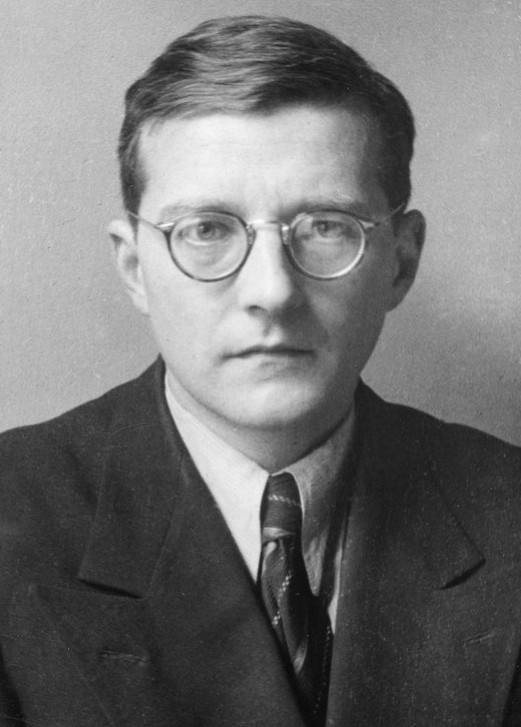
Brodsky Lawrence played the Western premiere of the Piano Sonata No. 2 by Dmitri Shostakovich in 1943.

CBS hired Brodsky Lawrence in 1938. On January 17, she played the first in a weekly series of recitals that were broadcast Monday afternoons. In 1939, she became the staff pianist for CBS. That same year she became the host of a new series of broadcast recitals that concentrated on modern and lesser-known compositions. She also played her own transcriptions of popular music, including "Caravan" by Juan Tizol and Duke Ellington. Her programs for these broadcasts included music by Chasins, Béla Bartók, Zoltán Kodály, Ernst von Dohnányi, Alec Templeton, and Stanley Bate.

In addition to solo recitals, Brodsky Lawrence played as a chamber music partner, accompanist, and concerto soloist throughout the 1940s. She partnered with singers, including soprano Eileen Farrell, as well as with chamber musicians such as the Dorian Quartet, among whose members were Bernard Greenhouse, with whom she played a cycle of works by Johannes Brahms. As a concerto soloist she performed with the CBS Symphony Orchestra, conducted by Herbert Menges and Bernard Herrmann; with the latter she played Dmitri Kabalevsky's Piano Concerto No. 1, as well as premiered Johnny Green's Music for Elizabeth and Richard Arnell's Piano Concerto No. 1. She also joined Lyn Murray in performances of light and popular music.

During World War II, Brodsky Lawrence played the Western premieres of works by two major Soviet composers. On September 29, 1943, she played the Western broadcast premiere of Dmitri Shostakovich's Piano Sonata No. 2, a score over which she had exclusive performing rights for a time. Her broadcast was preceded by a private performance that afternoon for invited critics and musicians. This was followed by the Western concert premiere of the work at Carnegie Hall on October 16. Her performance was part of a concert of Soviet music held under the auspices of the American Russian Institute, which sought to improve cultural relations between the United States and Soviet Union. Donald Ogden Stewart was master of ceremonies; the audience included Andrey Gromyko. On June 21, 1944, Brodsky Lawrence played the Western broadcast premiere of a waltz from Sergei Prokofiev's opera War and Peace, the first time any of its music was heard in the United States. This was followed on July 7, 1945, by the broadcast premiere of his Piano Sonata No. 8.

On February 24, 1944, Brodsky Lawrence married Theodore Lawrence, an engineer for the BBC.

During the 1950s, Brodsky Lawrence played on television with Percy Faith and Triggs; she had revived her piano duo with the latter in 1959, appearing in August on an episode of Camera Three entitled "Fête for Four Hands".

=== Crisis, shift, and renewal ===
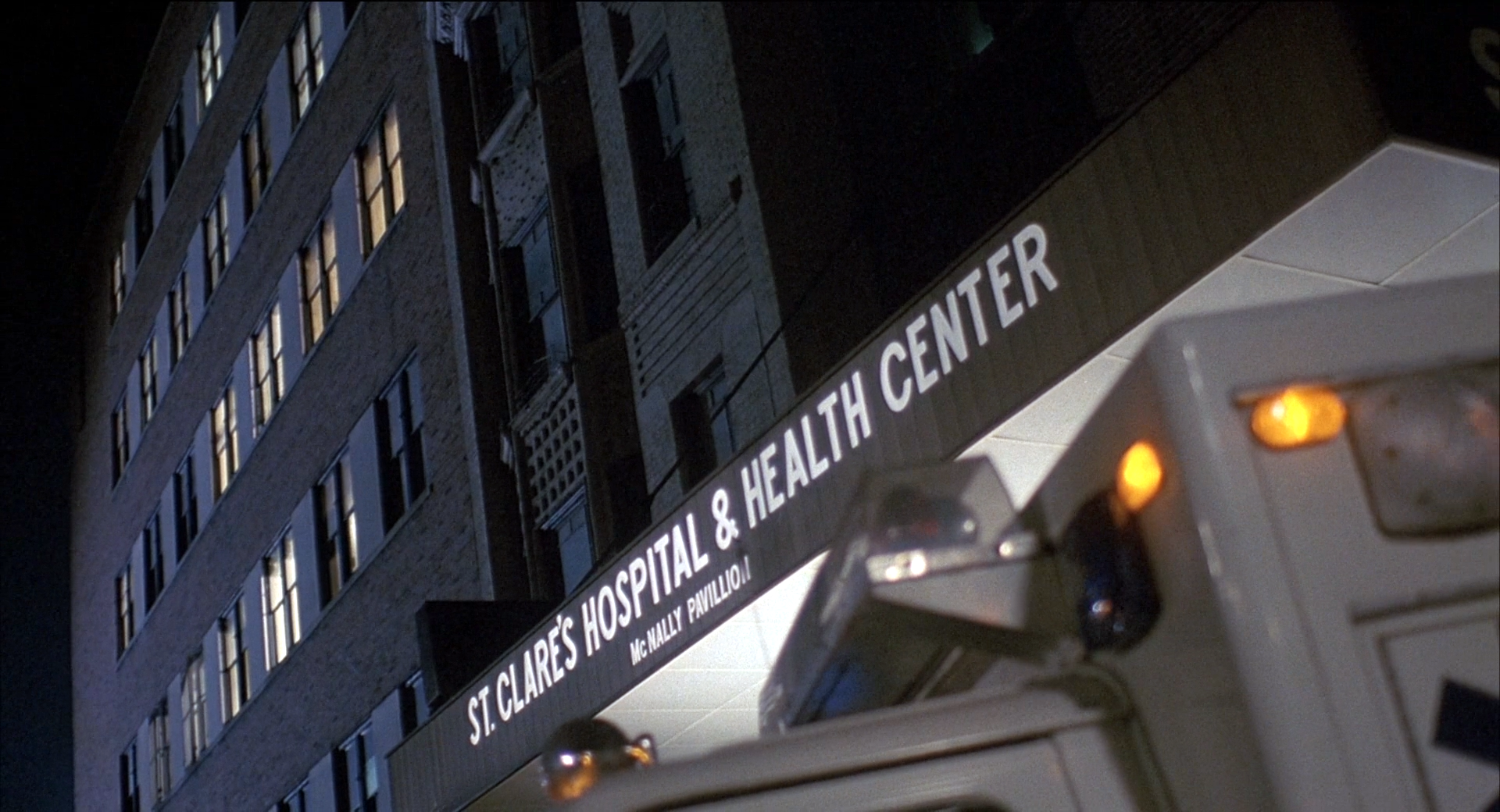
The death of Brodsky Lawrence's husband at St. Clare's Hospital prompted her to make a radical career change.

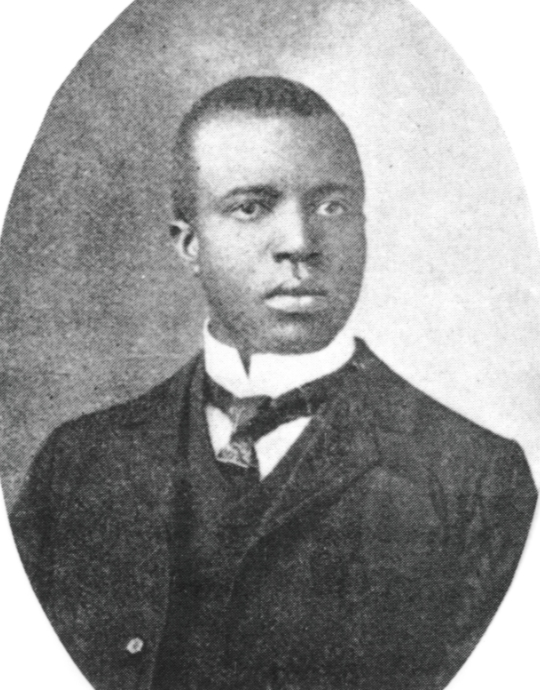
Brodsky Lawrence compiled and edited the first collected works edition of Scott Joplin's music.

On January 11, 1964, Theodore Lawrence died at St. Clare's Hospital in Manhattan from injuries incurred in an automobile accident earlier that day. She explained in a 1971 interview:

My life took a sharp turn [after my husband's death]. Maybe it was because I wanted to get away from my old life, my old memories. I turned to music publishing and editing.

Brodsky Lawrence subsequently destroyed her personal documents and abandoned the piano in favor of musicology: "I couldn't see myself as a little old lady sitting in a rocking chair fingering yellowed press clippings. So I burned mine—all of the mementoes from my concert career." She quit a brief stint as music editor in order to compile the complete works of Louis Moreau Gottschalk. These were published by Arno Press in a five-volume set in 1970, the first time a complete works edition had been compiled for an American composer. In 1971, she edited a two-volume set of the works of Scott Joplin, a project that was published by the New York Public Library with assistance from the Rockefeller Foundation. At the time of its publication, most scores of ragtime music were commercially unavailable. In January 1971, Brodsky Lawrence told critic Harold C. Schonberg:

You have no idea of the interest in Joplin. Once word began getting around that I was preparing an edition, material started coming in. People even sent in first editions. I got one from, will you believe it, Vienna.

A private all-Joplin concert, which included four excerpts from Treemonisha, celebrating the publication of his collected works took place in late 1971 at the auditorium of the Lincoln Center Library; performed by William Bolcom, Mary Lou Williams, and Joshua Rifkin. By July 1972, Brodsky Lawrence reported that the initial run of 1,000 copies of Joplin's collected works had sold out. Her publication is credited for being a major catalyst in the revival of Joplin's music. She was hailed by the New York Daily News in 1975 as the "queen of ragtime", a term she disliked:

Ms. Lawrence is the one who dug Scott Joplin out of the dust of libraries, took him away from the specialists, and set him loose on the world. Without her, The Sting would have had music by somebody else and there wouldn't be sixteen listings of ragtime music under Joplin's name in the classical section of Schwann's catalogue. So—whether she likes it or not—Ms. Lawrence is the queen of ragtime.

Brodsky Lawrence, as co-editor of the published score of Joplin's Treemonisha, shared its performing rights with the Joplin estate. She supervised the 1972 world premiere of the opera at Morehouse College in Atlanta, but the production by Katherine Dunham was received poorly, and Brodsky Lawrence was dissatisfied with it. In 1975, the Houston Grand Opera mounted a successful production with Brodsky Lawrence as artistic consultant. She commissioned Gunther Schuller to orchestrate Joplin's piano score.

=== Final years ===
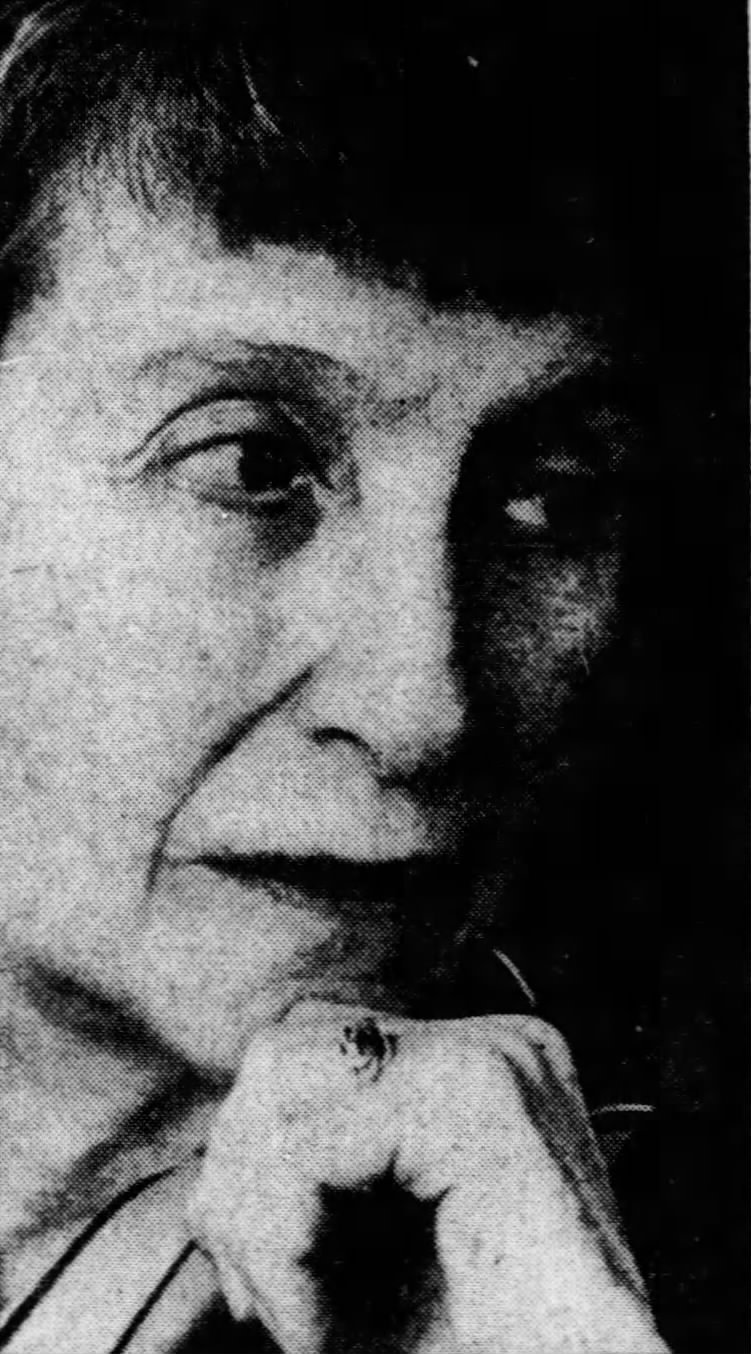
Brodsky Lawrence in 1976

After her successes with reviving interest in the music of Gottschalk and Joplin, Brodsky Lawrence moved on. "That's past", she told a journalist in 1975 who was inquiring about the origins of her interest in Joplin's music, "I hate talking about the past". To another that same year, she said "to dwell on the past is destructive".

Macmillan published her book Music for Patriots, Politicians, and Presidents: Harmonies and Discords of the First Hundred Years in 1976; an overview of musical culture in the United States during its first century of existence. It was awarded an ASCAP Deems Taylor Award that same year.

Her final project was Strong on Music, a three-volume work based on the diaries of George Templeton Strong surveying musical life in New York City during the 19th century. The third volume was nearly complete when Brodsky Lawrence died. The remaining portions of Strong's diaries that had yet to be published became the basis of the Music in Gotham Project database, which covers the period 1863–1875.

=== Death ===
Brodsky Lawrence died in Manhattan on September 18, 1996.

== Bibliography ==
- —— (1975). Music for Patriots, Politicians, and Presidents: Harmonies and Discords of the First Hundred Years. New York City: Macmillan Publishing. ISBN 9780025693906.
- —— (1988). Strong on Music: The New York Music Scene in the Days of George Templeton Strong, Volume 1 (Resonances, 1836–1849). Oxford University Press. ISBN 9780195041996.
- —— (1995). Strong on Music: The New York Music Scene in the Days of George Templeton Strong, Volume 2 (Reverberations, 1850–1856). University of Chicago Press. ISBN 9780226470108.
- —— (1999). Strong on Music: The New York Music Scene in the Days of George Templeton Strong, Volume 3 (Repercussions, 1857–1862). University of Chicago Press. ISBN 9780226470153.
