= Craig Sheppard =

- Born: November 26, 1947 (age 78); Philadelphia, Pennsylvania

Craig Douglass Sheppard (born 26 November 1947, Philadelphia) is an American concert pianist and educator of Scots-Irish, English and German descent.

== Early life and education ==
The son of Jeanne Linton and George Edgar Sheppard, Sheppard was raised in Jenkintown, PA, and graduated Abington High School in 1965. He studied with Eleanor Sokoloff at the Curtis Institute from 1965 to 1968 and Sasha Gorodnitzki at the Juilliard School from 1968 to 1971, graduating from the latter with Bachelor of Music and Master of Science degrees. In 1968, he won the bronze medal in the Busoni Competition. In 1972, he won the silver medal at the Leeds International Pianoforte Competition, which started his international career. He later won a bronze medal in the Dino Ciani Piano Competition (1975).

== Career ==
Living in London from 1973 to 1993, Sheppard continued his studies with Peter Feuchtwanger and Sir Clifford Curzon, and performed with major British orchestras on multiple occasions, as well as many on the European continent. During those years, he taught at Lancaster University, the Yehudi Menuhin School, and the Guildhall School of Music and Drama. He also gave frequent masterclasses at both Oxford and Cambridge universities. Sheppard returned to the United States in 1993 to take up a position as artist-in-residence at the University of Washington in Seattle, becoming a full professor there in 2004. In the past fifteen years, Sheppard has traveled extensively to the Far East, performing and giving master classes in Japan, Korea, China and Singapore. In 2012, he performed at the Nehru Memorial Library in New Delhi, and undertook a residency at the Melba Conservatory of the University of Melbourne. He also performed for the third time in New Zealand.

Sheppard's repertoire comprises over forty recital programs and sixty-five concerti. Recent performances of the 2014–15 season highlighted the 24 Preludes and Fugues of Shostakovich, which he performed in Houston, San Francisco, Oberlin, Shanghai, Beijing (the Forbidden City), and Seattle's Meany Theater. During the 2015–16 season, he will perform the cycle in London, New York, and Jerusalem, in addition to several American universities.

In the United States, Sheppard has performed with the orchestras of Philadelphia, Boston, Chicago, San Francisco, Seattle, Dallas, Atlanta, and Rochester, amongst others. Conductors he has worked with include Erich Leinsdorf, Sir Georg Solti, Kurt Sanderling, Sir Charles Mackerras, Sir John Pritchard, James Levine, Michael Tilson Thomas, Esa-Pekka Salonen and David Zinman. In his collaborative work, over the years he has performed with the Bartók, Cleveland and Emerson string quartets, singers Victoria de los Angeles, José Carreras, Renato Bruson and Irina Arkhipova, violinists Ida Haendel, Sylvia Rosenberg and Mayumi Fujikawa, and many musicians of the younger generation, including James Ehnes, Augustin Hadelich, Richard O’Neill, Edward Arron and Johannes Moser.

Sheppard is the co-founder and co-director (with Dr. Robin McCabe) of the Seattle Piano Institute, a camp for young pianists held every July since 2010 at the University of Washington.

== Published works ==
Since 2000, Sheppard has published an average of more than one CD per calendar year, all of live performances. The earlier CDs were issued on the AT (Annette Tangermann) Label in Berlin. Since 2004, his CDs have been issued by Roméo Records in New York.

His CDs can be found on the EMI (Classics for Pleasure), Philips/Polygram, CBS/Sony, ASV, AT-Label, and Roméo labels.

== Selected discography ==
- Liszt Sonata in B minor, Consolation in D flat, Petrarch Sonnets 104 and 123, 12th Hungarian Rhapsody
- Liszt Operatic Transcriptions and Paraphrases (Tannhäuser Overture, Am stillen Herd from Die Meistersinger, Liebestod from Tristan und Isolde, Rigoletto, Miserere from Il Trovatore, and Norma Paraphrase)
- Rachmaninoff Piano Concerto No.3 - with Sir John Pritchard and the London Philharmonic.
- Jolivet Concertino for Trumpet, Piano and String Orchestra (with Wynton Marsalis)
- Chopin - Two Nocturnes, Opus 27; Waltz in A flat, Opus 34/1; Impromptu in F sharp, Opus 36; Impromptu in G flat, Opus 51; Barcarolle, Opus 60; Polonaise in A flat, Opus 53.
- Prokofiev - The two violin sonatas and Cinq Melodies (with Mayumi Fujikawa)
- Chopin - 24 Preludes, Opus 28; Prelude, Opus 45; Scriabin 24 Preludes, Opus 11
- Bach - Goldberg Variations (live from the Philharmonie in Berlin)
- Scarlatti - 5 sonatas; Rachmaninoff - 9 Etudes Tableaux, Opus 39
- Beethoven - Diabelli Variations; Scriabin Sonata #5; Schubert Impromptu in G flat, D899/3
- Schumann - Blumenstück, Opus 19; Complete Novelletten, Opus 21
- Beethoven - A Journey: The 32 Piano Sonatas
- Bach - The Six Partitas
- Bach - The Inventions and Sinfonias (Die Aufrichtige Anleitung)
- Bach - Well Tempered Clavier, Book I
- Bach - Well Tempered Clavier, Book II
- Schubert - The Last Three Piano Sonatas, D958-960
- Liszt - Années de Pèlerinage, Books I and II
- Debussy - 24 Préludes
- Debussy - Estampes, Images I and II, 12 Études
- Shostakovich - 24 Preludes and Fugues, Opus 87
