= Midwest International Piano Competition =

The Midwest International Piano Competition is a piano competition held biannually at the University of Northern Iowa School of Music since 2014. It awards more than $25,000 in prize money, with a first prize of $10,000, and has two categories: Senior for up to 32 years old and Junior for up to 17 years old. The jury members of the inaugural competition included Arthur Greene, Alexander Toradze, and Miroslav Brejcha.

== Prize winners ==
=== Senior category ===
| Year | 1st prize | 2nd prize | 3rd prize |
|---|---|---|---|
| 2016 | (Russia) Timur Mustakimov | (United States) Allison Lee | (China) Zhenni Li |
| 2014 | (Ukraine) Margaryta Golovko | (United States) (Ukraine) Elina Akselrud | (Israel) Tomer Gewirtzman |

=== Junior category ===
| Year | 1st prize | 2nd prize | 3rd prize |
|---|---|---|---|
| 2016 | (Canada) J.J. (Jun Li) Bui | (Canada) Arthur Wang | (United States) Jeffrey Chin |
| 2014 | (United States) Michael Lu (Japan) Mayuki Miyashita | (United States) William Yang | (China) Yinuo Wang |
