= Leonid Nikolayev (pianist) =

Russian composer and pianist (1878–1942)

Leonid Vladimirovich Nikolayev
- Леонид Владимирович Николаев
- Born: August 13, 1878; Kiev, Russian Empire
- Died: October 11, 1942 (aged 64); Tashkent, Uzbek SSR, Soviet Union
- Occupations: Pianist; composer; pedagogue
- Honours: People's Artist of the RSFSR (1938)

Leonid Vladimirovich Nikolayev (Russian: Леони́д Влади́мирович Никола́ев, August 13, 1878 – October 11, 1942) was a Russian and Soviet pianist, composer and pedagogue. People's Artist of the RSFSR (1938).

== Biography ==
Nikolayev was born in Kiev in 1878. He studied at the Moscow Conservatory with Sergei Taneyev and Mikhail Ippolitov-Ivanov. For many years Nikolayev was a professor of piano at the Leningrad Conservatory, and was for a short and unsuccessful period director of the institution. His students at the Conservatory included Vladimir Sofronitsky, Maria Yudina, Dmitri Shostakovich, Vera Razumovskaya, Nathan Perelman, Wiktor Łabuński, Vera Vinogradova, Samary Savshinsky, Nadia Reisenberg, and Alexander Zakin.

He became close friends with Shostakovich, who "admired him as a first-class musician and a man of great wisdom and learning" and also said of him: "He trained not simply pianists, but in the first place thinking musicians. He didn't create a school in the specific sense of some single narrow professional direction. He shaped and nurtured a broad aesthetic trend in the sphere of pianistic art." Shostakovich's 1943 Piano Sonata No. 2 was dedicated to his former teacher.

Nikolayev was evacuated to Tashkent along with other musicians, after Germany invaded Russia in 1941, and died there in 1942.

His compositional output includes symphonic works, choral works, string quartets, and solo works for violin, cello, and piano.
