= ParticleIllusion =

Visual effects software

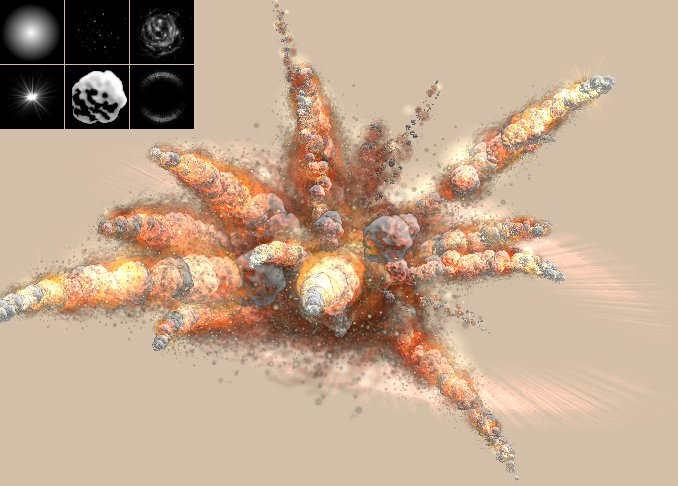
1 frame of an explosion animation done in pIllusion 3 with motion blur enabled. The upper left displays the used particle shapes (textures). Featuring the super emitter which is usually applied in emitters of firework and explosion effects.

particleIllusion (pIllusion for short) is a stand-alone computer graphics application based on the particle system technique which allows users to create graphical animations, e.g. fire, explosions, smoke, fireworks, and various abstract visual effects. The predecessor of pIllusion is Illusion 2 (1999~2001) which is licensed to Impulse Inc. The chief programmer, Alan Lorence, was in disagreement with Impulse Inc and formed another company by the name of Wondertouch. The upgraded version of Illusion has been rebranded and released as particleIllusion 3.0, which features new functions such as super emitter and force field.

== Overview ==
The program works solely in two-dimensional space, but the random motion of particles may provide a virtually three-dimensional animation. pIllusion can be supported by OpenGL to accelerate the rendering speed which allows an accurate real-time preview with a proper video display card. Recently, pillusion has implemented a three-dimensional simulation function as of its recent free-to-download update.
