= Susan Starr =

American pianist

- Born: Philadelphia, Pennsylvania, United States
- Genres: Classical
- Occupation: Pianist
- Instrument: Piano

Susan Starr (born Philadelphia, Pennsylvania) is an American pianist.

== Career ==
Susan began her studies with Eleanor Sokoloff at age four. Starr began her studies at the Curtis Institute of Music at the age of seven where she studied with Rudolf Serkin from the age of thirteen until her graduation in 1961, and was one of the youngest pianists to have studied at the institute. She was a Silver Medalist at the 1962 Tchaikovsky Competition.

Starr performed on more than fifty occasions with the Philadelphia Orchestra, since her debut at age six, an engagement that marked her as the youngest soloist to ever appear with a major orchestra. She has also been heard with the New York Philharmonic, first appearing with them at age eight, and marking the start of her becoming a Steinway Artist, as well as the Chicago Symphony Orchestra, Moscow State Symphony, and the National Symphony Orchestra and the orchestras of Atlanta, Baltimore, Dallas, St. Louis, Denver, Houston, Pittsburgh, Indianapolis, Memphis, Milwaukee, Minnesota, Montreal, New Jersey, New Orleans, and Vancouver, among others. In 1977, Starr performed at the White House at the invitation of President Carter.

Among the eminent conductors who have chosen Starr as soloist throughout her career are Charles Dutoit, Aldo Ceccato, Rafael Frühbeck de Burgos, Erich Kunzel, Raymond Leppard, Sir Neville Marriner, Gennady Rozhdestvensky, Maxim Shostakovich, Joseph Silverstein, Stanisław Skrowaczewski, and Leonard Slatkin as well as the late conductors Leonard Bernstein, Arthur Fiedler, Eugene Ormandy, Max Rudolf, Robert Shaw, and William Steinberg. More recently she has performed under the baton of conductors such as Kenneth Schermerhorn, Leif Bjaland, Emil de Cou, Gerhardt Zimmerman, George Hanson, Alastair Neale, Richard Westerfield, Miguel Harth-Bedoya, Michael Christie, and William Eddins.

Starr's active international career has taken her on three tours of the Soviet Union, more than a dozen trips to the Far East and South America, as well as to Belgium, England, Germany, Greece, Italy and Sweden, and Hong Kong. Starr returned to Moscow later in 1994 as one of the judges of the Tchaikovsky Competition. Over the span of her career, she has judged many international competitions.

She remains busy performing and teaching. Students from all over the world seek her instruction. Many have met her through summer festivals including the Sarasota Music Festival or the Piano Institute at New Paltz. In the United States, she has also made appearances at the Ravinia, Chautauqua, Mann Center for the Performing Arts, Grand Teton Music Festival, and Ann Arbor May festivals.

Among her engagements for September, 2004–2005 season are performances of the Mendelssohn Piano Concerto and Sergei Rachmaninov–Paganini Variations with the Augusta Symphony; Schumann Piano Concerto with the Curtis Institute Orchestra in Kimmel Center's Verizon Hall; Shostakovich Concerto No. 1 with the Philadelphia Classical Symphony and S. Rachmaninov-Paganini Variations with Rutgers University Orchestra in Isaac Stern Auditorium at Carnegie Hall.

Starr was a Distinguished Professor at Mason Gross School of the Arts at Rutgers University.

She has appeared on hundreds of television programs including The Tonight Show. The most recent one is Performance Today.

== Personal life ==
Starr has two children, Lori Amada, and Eric Amada. Lori followed her mother's footsteps with an invitation to the White House followed by a performance for President Ronald Reagan. Lori Amada has performed as French horn soloist with orchestras around the world on more than fifty occasions, and as an orchestral musician has received high praise from conductors such as Leonard Bernstein, Zubin Mehta, Riccardo Muti, and Aldo Ceccato. Lori Amada graduated from the Curtis Institute of Music, the third generation to attend the prestigious school. Eric has his own artist management company. Susan's father, Isadore Schwartz, died in 2001 at the age of 86. He started this long line of musicians. Isadore attended the Curtis Institute of Music and later became the principal second violinist of the Philadelphia Orchestra.

== Recordings ==
- Bach: French Suite No. 5; English Suite No. 3; Partitas Nos. 1 & 2, Susan Starr, May 11, 1999, Hallmark, ASIN: B00000IGJF
- Rachmaninoff; R. Strauss Cello Sonatas, Boeckheler, Susan Starr, June 20, 1996, Mastersound, ASIN: B00008FER6
- Mendelssohn: Trio for Violin, Cello and Piano No. 2 in C minor, Op. 66 / Tchaikovsky: Trio for Violin, Cello and Piano in A minor, Op. 50 – The Starr–Kim–Boeckheler Trio, June 20, 1996, Mastersound, ASIN: B00008FER3
- Premiere Chamber Works / Sara Lambert Bloom, Susan Starr, Sara Lambert Bloom, Julius Baker, 06/20/1995, Centaur Records, Catalog #2217
