= Min Kwon =

American musician

Min Kwon (born Kwon Min-kyung) is a Korean-American pianist and professor of piano at the Mason Gross School of the Arts at Rutgers University.

== Early life and education ==
Kwon began playing the piano at the age of 3, under the tutelage of her mother who ran a music school out of her home. She also studied violin, cello, and choral singing. In the sixth grade Kwon decided to focus fully on piano.

Kwon's family immigrated to Closter, New Jersey when she was 14 years old. There, she received a full scholarship to study at the Curtis Institute of Music in Philadelphia, and she made her North American debut with the Philadelphia Orchestra at the age of 16.

After earning her Bachelor of Music Degree at the age of 19, Kwon continued her studies at The Juilliard School with Martin Canin. She received MM and DMA degrees from Juilliard, and completed post-doctoral studies at the University of Mozarteum in Austria with Hanz Leygraf.

== Career ==
=== Music ===
As the winner of the Beethoven Competition, Kwon made her New York debut in 1992 with the Juilliard Orchestra at the Avery Fisher Hall of Lincoln Center.

Kwon and her sister Yoon, a violinist, were the first Koreans to record for RCA Red Seal Records in 1996. Kwon was Co‐Director of the Vienna ConcertoFest in Austria. From 2015 until 2018 she was on the Juilliard School Council in New York.

=== Teaching ===
Kwon became a professor of Piano at the Mason Gross School in 2002. She will serve as the Rutgers–New Brunswick laureate for the 2026–2027 academic year.

== Personal life ==
Kwon is married to Leonard Lee, who is chairman of surgery at Robert Wood Johnson University Hospital. The couple have two daughters.

== Discography ==
- 1996 Yoon Kwon, Min Kwon / Min Kwon (works by Part, Brahms, de Falla, Gershwin, Kreisler)
- 2000 You and Me, Yoon and Min (works by Chopin, Rachmaninoff, Copland, Schonfield)
- 2005 Concerto Extravaganza (works by Bach, Mozart, Beethoven, Mendelssohn, Chopin, Grieg, Rachmaninoff)
- 2008 Schubert and Liszt (Schubert Sonata D 850, Schubert/Liszt Gretchen am Spinnrade, Liszt Gnomenreigen, Reminiscence de Don Juan)
- 2010 Franz Schubert: Music for Piano Four Hands (with Robert Lehrbaumer)
- 2015 CME Presents: Piano Celebration Vol. I (works by Horowitz, Barber, Rachmaninoff, Brahms, Rzewski)
- 2016 CME Presents: Piano Celebration Vol. II (works by Paul Real for four hands)
- 2019 Dance!
- 2026 America/Beautiful (76 variations on "America the Beautiful" by American composers)
