= Harold Triggs =

American classical composer

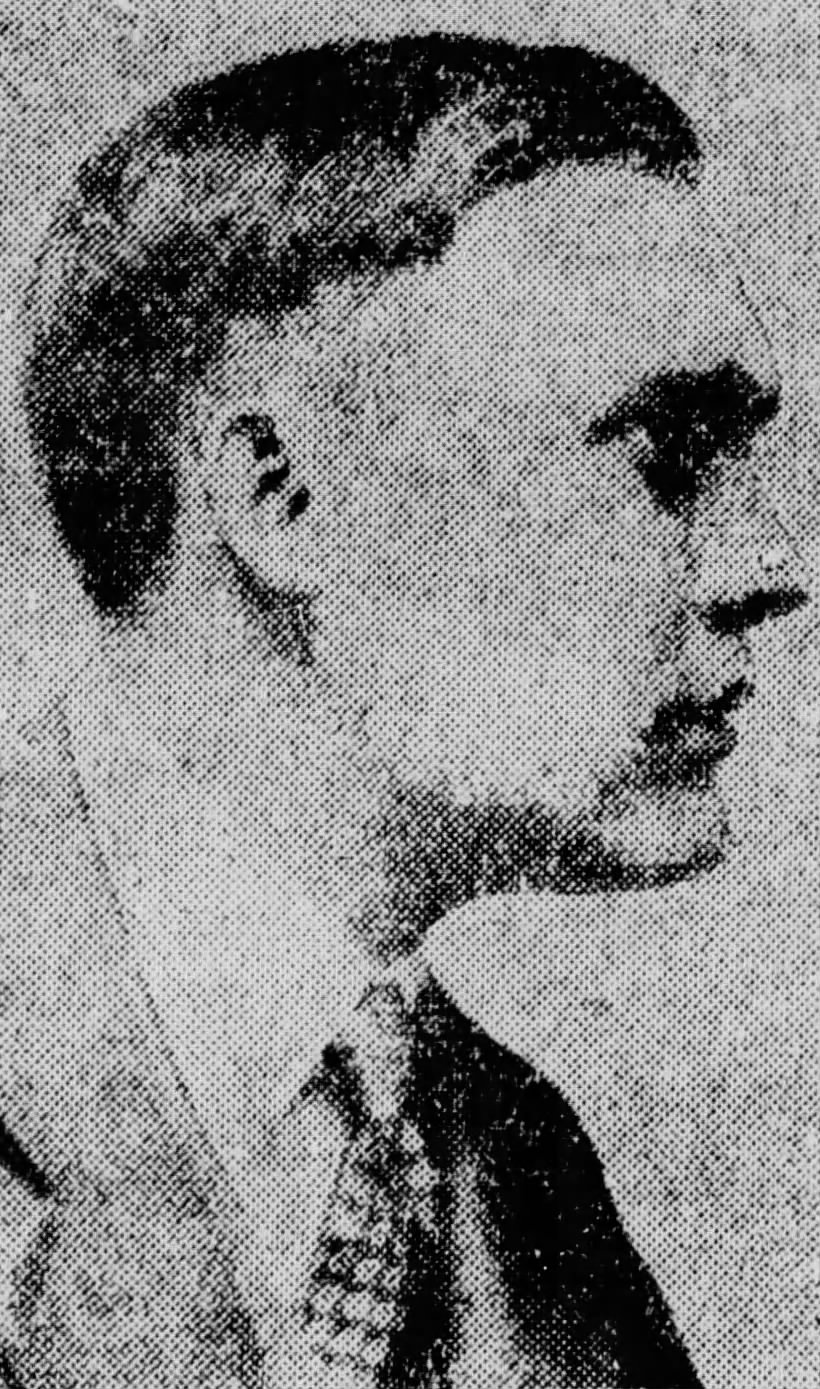
Harold Triggs in 1948

Harold Melvin Triggs (December 25, 1900 – July, 1984) was an American composer and pianist.

A native of Denver, where his father directed a company which sold musical instruments, Triggs studied at the Bush Conservatory under Julie Rivé-King, and also had lessons with Josef Lhévinne. He had a long career as a teacher, beginning at his alma mater and continuing at the Juilliard School and Columbia University. Concurrently he appeared as a concert pianist, both alone and as a duo with Vera Brodsky. Most of his music is for piano; other works include the orchestral The Bright Land, which was taken up by Leopold Stokowski and Howard Hanson among others, and recorded by the latter. As a pianist Triggs made a number of piano rolls during his career.

Triggs died in Thomasville, Georgia. His papers are held by Columbia University.
