= Sofia Moshevich =

Sofia Moshevich סופיה מושביץ'
- Born: 1949 (age 75–76); Kharkiv, Ukraine
- Occupation(s): Pianist, teacher, researcher
- Instrument: Piano

Sofia Moshevich (Hebrew: סופיה מושביץ'; born 1949) is a Ukrainian-born pianist, teacher and researcher who lived in Moscow, Jerusalem and Johannesburg before emigrating to Canada where she now lives in Toronto. Since the early 1970s, she has taken a special interest in the Russian composer Dmitri Shostakovich, making a careful analysis of his recorded performances as a pianist. Two books document the results of her work: Dmitri Shostakovich, Pianist and Shostakovich's Music for Piano Solo, Interpretation and Performance. She also contributed a chapter on piano music to A Shostakovich Companion, edited by Michael Mishra.

== Biography ==
Moshevich was born in Kharkiv, Ukraine, in 1949, where she studied at the school of Professional Music for Gifted Children. From 1967, she studied piano at the Gnessin Institute in Moscow under the Soviet master Naum Shtarkman. She emigrated to Israel in 1975, continuing her studies in musicology under Joachim Braun at the Bar Ilan University (1976–78) while teaching at Jerusalem's Rubin Academy. She also gave public performances as a soloist and accompanist, including recordings for the Israel Broadcasting Authority. She often played pieces by Shostakovich. She moved to South Africa in 1981, where she studied and taught at the University of the Witwatersrand, Johannesburg, and participated in broadcasts for the South African Broadcasting Corporation. She was granted scholarships from the University of Witwatersrand, the Abraham and Olga Lipman Fund and the South African Jewish Board of Deputies Benjamin Newman Bursary (1983–84).

== Shostakovich research ==
Moshevich's interest in Shostakovich goes back to the early 1970s when she was studying at the Gnessin Institute. She was surprised to find that, despite generally accepted views to the contrary, early recordings of his music demonstrated that his piano performances compared favourably with those of the great Soviet pianists. On that basis, she built up and analysed an extensive collection of his recordings. In 1987, while at Witwatersrand, she completed a 120-page doctoral thesis titled "Shostakovich as Interpreter of His Own Music: a Study of Recorded Performances".

In Dmitri Shostakovich, Pianist, Moshevich reviews the composer's recordings as well as the reception of his performances. The book has received mixed reviews. Shostakovich expert David Fanning describes it as "richly rewarding" when considered as "an enthusiastic fact-gathering mission" but criticises it for a failure to develop a "richer critical vocabulary to articulate the strengths in his playing". Writing in DSCH Journal, Nigel Papworth compliments the work on its coverage of important gaps in the composer's biography and its careful attention to detail. By contrast, Mark Mazullo criticizes the work as presenting a "superficial commentary" on the music of Shostakovich although he admits it contains some new reminiscences and quotes which unfortunately are not adequately discussed.

She has also published on pianist Glenn Gould's Russian tour.

== Family ==
Moshevich is the daughter of Mark and Matlia (Matilda) Moshevich and is married to Arik Moshevich (née Poupko). Her maiden name is thus the same as her married name. She has two children: Avital (Tali) Kellerstein and Jonathan.
