= Josef Lhévinne =

Russian pianist and teacher (1874–1944)

Josef Lhévinne Иосиф Левин
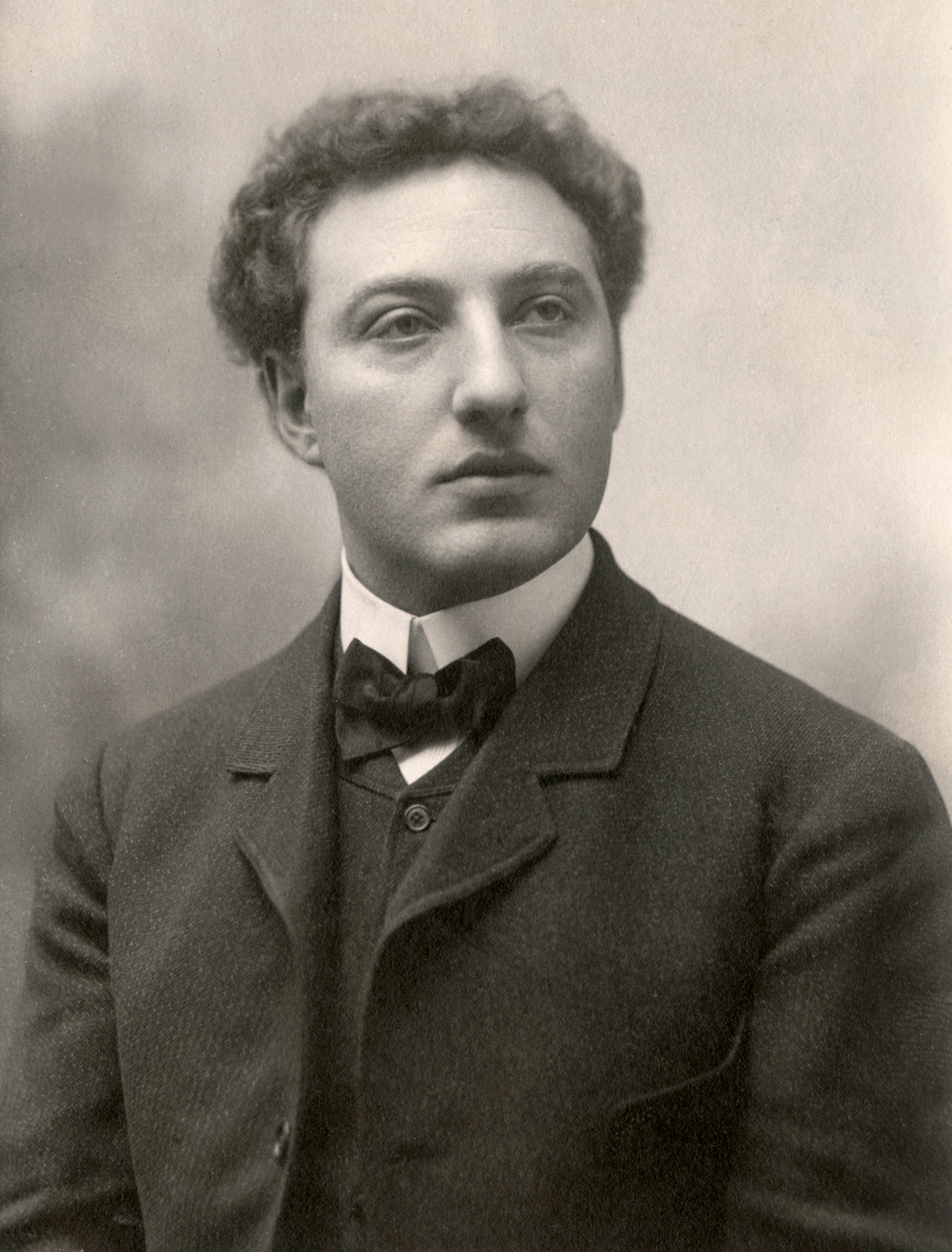
- Lhévinne in New York, c. 1906–1913

Background information
- Born: Joseph Arkadievich Levin; 13 December 1874; Oryol, Russia
- Died: 2 December 1944 (aged 69) New York City, U.S.
- Genres: Classical
- Occupation: Pianist
- Instrument: Piano

External audio
- You may hear Josef Lhévinne performing Frédéric Chopin's Etudes - Op. 10 No. 11, Op. 25 No. 6 and Op. 25 No. 11 in 1935 Here on archive.org

Josef Lhévinne (Note: Russian: Иосиф Аркадьевич Левин, romanized: Iosif Arkadyevich Levin.) (lay-VEEN; 13 December 1874 – 2 December 1944) was a Russian pianist and piano teacher. Lhévinne wrote a short book in 1924 that is considered a classic: Basic Principles in Pianoforte Playing.

== Biography ==
Joseph Arkadievich Levin (the name was altered in western Europe by a manager who thought "Lhévinne" more distinctive and less Jewish) was born into a Jewish family of musicians in Oryol south of Moscow. He studied at the Imperial Conservatory in Moscow under Vasily Safonov. He made his public debut at the age of 14 with Ludwig van Beethoven's Emperor Concerto in a performance conducted by his musical hero Anton Rubinstein. He graduated at the top of a class that included both Sergei Rachmaninoff and Alexander Scriabin, winning the gold medal for piano in 1892. In 1895 Levin won the Second International Anton Rubinstein Competition held in Berlin, emerging as the favoured pianist in a group of thirty-three candidates with his performance of Rubinstein's Piano Concerto No. 5 in E-flat major.

In 1898, Levin married Rosina Bessie, a fellow Moscow Conservatory student, a pianist and winner of the gold medal for piano in her year. The two began to give concerts together, a practice that lasted until his death. Faced with antisemitism and the political turbulence of the Russian Revolution, they moved to Berlin in 1907. There Lhévinne gained a reputation as one of the leading virtuosi and teachers of his day. They were declared enemy aliens at the outbreak of World War I and became trapped there. They had lost what money they had saved in Russian banks in the 1917 Revolution and were unable to perform in concerts due to the war. They endured years of hardship, surviving on the poor income from a handful of students.

After the war they were at last free to leave Germany, and in 1919 emigrated to New York City in the United States. Lhévinne continued his concert career and also taught piano at the Juilliard School. Regarded as one of the supreme technicians of his day by virtually all of his more famous contemporaries (even Vladimir Horowitz admired his pianistic command), he never achieved their level of success with the public. He may have made his excellence look and sound too easy, but he also enjoyed teaching more than performing. He settled into a life of concert tours and teaching. Lhévinne spent time each summer starting in 1922, at Bonnie Oaks, relaxing from public life and sometimes teaching young musicians. On 2 December 1944, he died suddenly in New York from a heart attack, a few days short of his 70th birthday.

== Recordings ==
Lhévinne made only a few recordings, some of which are considered to be examples of perfect technique and musical elegance. The discs of the Chopin Études Op. 25, Nos. 6 & 11 recorded for RCA Victor in 1935 and Schulz-Evler's arrangement of Johann Strauss II's Blue Danube Waltz, also for Victor in 1928, are legendary among pianists and connoisseurs. His piano roll of Schumann's Papillons Op.2 and 1935 recording of Schumann's Toccata Op.7 are considered some of the definitive performances of these works. In the words of Harold C. Schonberg: "His tone was like the morning stars singing together, his technique was flawless even if measured against the fingers of Hofmann and Rachmaninoff, and his musicianship was sensitive." Lhévinne made a number of piano rolls in the 1920s for Ampico, a collection of which were recorded and released on the Argo label in 1966. Lhévinne also recorded three times for the Welte-Mignon reproducing piano. He recorded Mozart's Sonata for Two Pianos in D major K.448, with his wife Rosina for RCA Victor in 1935.

== Literature ==
- Basic Principles in Pianoforte Playing (1972), Dover Publications, New York, ISBN 0-486-22820-7 (Repr. d. Ausg. Philadelphia, Penn. 1924)

== Notable students ==
- Stell Andersen
- John Browning
- Mildred Portney Chase
- Sascha Gorodnitzki
- Byron Janis
- Adele Marcus
- Ruth Slenczynska
- Harold Triggs
- Paul Wells
- Nannie Louise Wright
- Dorothy Kendrick, pianist, Naumburg winner
