= Gregor Benko =

American music historian (1944–2026)

- Benko, in the 1990s
- Born: Robert George Benko; August 4, 1944; Cleveland, Ohio, U.S.
- Died: August 12, 2026 (aged 82); Syracuse, New York, U.S.
- Occupations: Writer; Record producer; Collector-historian
- Organizations: International Piano Archives
- Awards: American Liszt Society Medal

Gregor Benko (born Robert George Benko; August 4, 1944 – August 12, 2026) was an American writer, lecturer, record producer and collector-historian whose primary focus was classical piano performance documented on recordings from (or having to do with) the Romantic Era. His work helped lay the groundwork for the "Romantic Revival", which continued on into the 21st century.

Robert George Benko was born to factory-worker parents in Cleveland, Ohio, on August 4, 1944. His family was hostile to classical music; the critic Zachary Woolfe speculates that Benko began going by the name Gregor in order to symbolically distance himself from them. He never learned to play an instrument. He briefly attended college in Michigan.

Benko was the founder, along with Albert Petrak, of the International Piano Archives (initially named the International Piano Library but later changed due to state law). Benko managed the non-profit institution for two decades, attracting Spanish virtuosa Alicia de Larrocha to act as the President of the corporation, and building an enormous collection of recordings, scores, memorabilia and associated matter concerning concert pianists. In 1977 Benko donated the collections to the University of Maryland, College Park, where they formed the nucleus of the International Piano Archives at Maryland.

Among Benko's most significant achievements was the unearthing and publishing of many previously unknown recordings of the Polish-American virtuoso Josef Hofmann, as well as dozens of historic recordings by other "golden age" pianists. He is also credited with rediscovering and bringing back to public awareness the elderly and reclusive Hungarian piano virtuoso Ervin Nyiregyházi. The recordings that Benko produced, initially for the International Piano Archives, as well as new recordings he made with Nyiregyházi that were issued by Columbia Records, were heatedly discussed for a time due to the pianist's enormous dynamic range and willful interpretive style. Well-regarded critic Harold C. Schonberg - also a devotee of Romantic pianism - called one of them "a divine madness".

He had almost no formal education, but credited his close relationships with Schonberg and Frank Cooper, founder of the Festival of Neglected Romantic Music at Butler University, as the most important professional associations in his life, and considered each a mentor.

Benko's later career included lecturing, articles, reviews, liner notes. With Edward Blickstein, he co-authored Chopin's Prophet, the Life of pianist Vladimir de Pachmann. He worked for over thirty years on a comprehensive biography of Josef Hofmann.

He was awarded the American Liszt Society medal at the 2017 Festival of The American Liszt Society in April 2017. The citation for the medal concludes with these words by Dr. Richard Zimdars: "Gregor's life work has made and will continue to make a priceless contribution to preserving the aural and documentary history of piano performance in the twentieth century for listeners, performers, scholars, and Lisztians. It is fitting to award him the Medal of The American Liszt Society."

Benko died in Syracuse, New York, on August 12, 2026, at the age of 82.
