= Michele Levin =

American classical pianist and composer

- Born: 1945 (age 80–81); Miami, Florida, U.S.
- Education: Curtis Institute of Music (Dip.) (MM)
- Occupations: Classical pianist, composer
- Notable work: Piano Sonata (age 12), String Quartet No.1 (2007), Quintet for Bassoon and String Quartet (2017)
- Awards: First Prize, Johann Sebastian Bach International Piano Competition (Washington, D.C.)

Michele Wendlyn Levin (born 1945) is an American classical pianist and composer based out of New York City, renowned for her interpretations of the music of Johann Sebastian Bach.

As an orchestral soloist, she has performed with the Philadelphia Orchestra, Boston Pops Orchestra, Florida Philharmonic Orchestra, New World Symphony, Albany Symphony Orchestra, Virginia Symphony Orchestra, and many more, regularly touring throughout the United States, Canada, Europe, Asia, and Central and South America. The Curtis Institute of Music lists her as a notable alum, and she was described as "a highly musical pianist" by Bernard Holland in The New York Times.

== Early life ==
Levin was born in Miami, Florida in 1945, and her father, Dr. Herbert Levin, was a dentist. She showed prodigious talent from a young age, picking out tunes at the piano from the age of three, and composing began soon after. Lessons began at the age of 6. In 1955, her family traveled to Philadelphia on the pretense of publishing her compositions. This proved successful, and the publisher contacted Efrem Zimbalist. Impressed by her playing, he offered the 10-year-old a scholarship to the Curtis Institute of Music. Her mother felt she should wait a year, so Levin entered at the age of 11 as a double major in both piano and composition. At Curtis, she studied piano with Eleanor Sokoloff, chamber music with Vladimir Sokoloff, and composition with Vittorio Giannini.

== Professional career ==
After winning a special composition competition award put on by the Philadelphia Orchestra for her 14-page Piano Sonata at the age of 12, she made her concerto debut with the Philadelphia Orchestra at the Robin Hood Dell (now the Mann Center for the Performing Arts), where she performed Beethoven's Piano Concerto No. 2 at the age of 13 under conductor Richard Korn. Levin subsequently received her diploma in piano performance (1963) and was the first women to receive a master's degree in composition from Curtis in 1965. Her compositions at Curtis included Three Reflections for Baritone (premiered by William Workman), and a piano trio (premiered by the composer, Sergiu Luca, and Russell Smith). The second movement is a homage to former-president John F. Kennedy, who was assassinated earlier that year.

She won the First Prize at the Johann Sebastian Bach International Piano Competition, Washington, D.C. in 1964, receiving mention in Time. Other past prize-winners have included Ursula Oppens, Angela Hewitt, Yoheved Kaplinsky, and Chen Pi-hsien. In 2014, she gave a tribute concert for pianist Lili Kraus, of which Kraus's Steinway was donated for the event. Kraus's daughter was in attendance.

She has recorded for Koch International, EcoClassics, Altarus, and the Canadian Broadcasting Companies. and her playing has been regularly featured on NPR.

== Collaborations ==
She has extensively collaborated with violinists Joseph Silverstein, Ida Levin, Ruggerio Ricci, Joan Field, Nina Beilina, Joseph Genualdi, Julia Sakharova, Steven Ansell, Mark Kaplan, Sergiu Luca, Donald Weilerstein, Ik-Hwan Bae, Cho-Liang Lin, Arve Tellefson, Sidney Harth, Andrew Dawes, Yehonaton Berick, and Angella Ang of the Ahn Trio; with violists Rivka Golani, Karen Dreyfus, Paul Neubauer, and Atar Arad; and with cellists Yehuda Hanani, Ronald Thomas, and Wolfgang Boettcher. She has performed with clarinetists Eli Eban, James Campbell, and Charles Neidich; with harpist Heidi Lehwalder; and with flutists Carol Wincenc and Eugenia Zuckerman. She is known for her collaborations with the Metropolitan Opera in New York, having performed with vocalists Gwendolyn Bradley, Marvis Martin, Paul Sperry, Martina Arroyo, D’Anna Fortunato, Carol Farley, Lucy Shelton, Judy Drucker, and Aryeh Nussbaum Cohen. The Israeli cellist Yehuda Hanani has recorded several albums with her, including Schubert/Schumann for Cello and Piano, and Dazzle and Nostalgia, which was praised by Tim Smith. Together, they also made one of the only historic LPs of Leo Ornstein's Sonata No. 1 for Cello and Piano, Op. 52, which signed them to Koch International. As a soloist, she has worked with conductors like Leif Bjaland and James Judd. She has also played dual-piano music with Seymour Lipkin, Steven De Groote, Frank Cooper, and Paul Posnak.

She has performed as a guest artist at Carnegie Hall, 92nd Street Y, Alice Tully Hall, Metropolitan Museum of Art, New World Festival of the Arts, and the Chopin Foundation Festival. Levin has been an artist in residence and toured with the internationally acclaimed Arianna String Quartet, Miami Quartet, and Muir Quartet, which premiered her String Quartet No.1 in 2007, as well as her Quintet for Bassoon and String Quartet. She also gave the world premiere of Joan Tower's quartet White Granite.
