= Jo-Michael Scheibe =

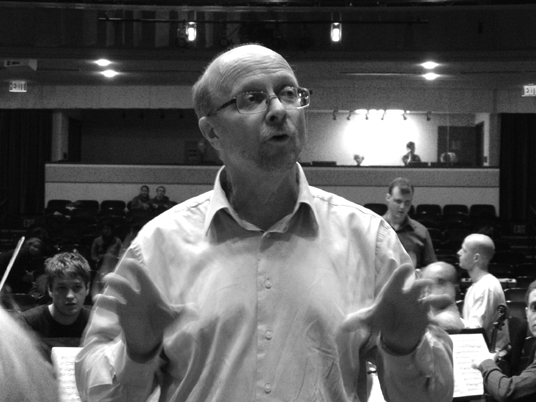
- Born: August 31, 1950 (age 76); Los Angeles, California, United States
- Occupations: Conductor; Academic teacher
- Organizations: Thornton School of Music

Jo-Michael Scheibe (born 1950) was the former chair of the Department of Choral and Sacred Music at the Thornton School of Music at the University of Southern California. Following a sabbatical in Fall of 2022, Scheibe retired from his position as Professor of Choral and Sacred Music and was named professor emeritus of Music. In April 2023, he was named a 2023-2024 Fulbright Scholar in Ireland. He formerly conducted the USC Chamber Singers. In 2011 he assumed a new post as National President of the American Choral Directors’ Association. No stranger to the ACDA, Scheibe previously served as the organization's Western Division President (1991–1993), as well as National Repertoire and Standards Chairperson for Community Colleges (1980–1989). Ensembles under his leadership have sung at six national ACDA conventions (1985, 1991, 1993, 1997, 2003, 2007), as well as two national conventions of the Music Educators National Conference (1996, 2000), and various regional and state conventions.

== Biography ==
A native of Southern California, Scheibe developed his love for music through his singing in church and at Westminster High School. After earning a degree in vocal and choral music education at California State University at Long Beach, he taught high school music at Vintage High School in Napa, California, and then at Huntington Beach High School. Other appointments included Long Beach City College, Northern Arizona University and the University of Miami's Frost School of Music. Scheibe's artistic collaborations have included choral performances with Luciano Pavarotti, José Carreras, Salvatore Licitra, Maria Guleghina and Kenny Loggins, as well as preparation of choruses for Sir Colin Davis and the London Symphony Orchestra, Franz Welser-Möst and the Cleveland Orchestra, Michael Tilson Thomas and the New World Symphony and conductors Helmuth Rilling, Jahja Ling, Edoardo Müller, James Judd, Max Valdez, Thomas Sanderling and Alain Lombard, among others. Recordings of ensembles under Scheibe's direction have been released on the Albany, Cane, Naxos, Arsis, and ANS labels.

A champion of contemporary music, Scheibe previously commissioned and performed new works of choral literature. He has helped to launch careers of promising young composers and to promote music by international composers largely unknown in the United States. Music publishers Walton, Colla Voce Music and Santa Barbara distribute the Jo-Michael Scheibe Choral Series internationally.

Fall 2008 marked Scheibe's return to the University of Southern California after a 15-year tenure as director of Choral Studies at the University of Miami’s Frost School of Music (1993–2008), as well as previous faculty appointments at Northern Arizona University in Flagstaff (1985–1993), Long Beach City College (1978–1985), Vintage High School in Napa, California and Huntington Beach High School. Scheibe received his D.M.A. from the University of Southern California and his B.A. and M.M. degrees from California State University at Long Beach, where he was presented with the distinguished alumnus award.

Scheibe has served as music and artistic director of many community choral organizations, including the Master Chorale of South Florida, the Master Chorale of Tampa Bay, and the Long Beach Master Chorale. He has directed music ministries in churches as well, most recently at Coral Gables Congregational Church, where he conducted the Chancel Choir and Vocal Ensemble, which appeared at the 2004 ACDA Southern Division Convention in Nashville. A member of Chorus America, the International Federation of Choral Music, and several other professional and education organizations. He has conducted for Jubilate Mozart! with Hungarian composer János Czifra, performing scores where Mozart first composed them in the Salzburg Dom. Scheibe is in frequent demand internationally as a clinician, conductor and adjudicator for choruses at the university, community college, community and secondary levels.

== Recordings ==
My Christmas: Andrea Bocelli and David Foster DVD - USC Chamber Singers -2009- Sony Classical

Legacy: Sixty Years of the USC Chamber Singers - Charles Hirt, Rodney Eichenberger, James Vail, William Dehning, Paul Salamunovich, Jo-Michael Scheibe. 2009 USC Choral Recordings

Portrait of the Soul- Frost Chorale - 2007 - Albany Records

Universidad Navideña—Frost Chorale. 2006. EMI Records.

Maslanka Mass – Frost Chorale and Frost Wind Symphony. 2006. Naxos Records.

What Dreams May Come – University of Miami Chorale. February 2004. Albany Records.

Welcome All Wonders – Coral Gables Congregational Church Choirs. October 2003.

Acadama - University of Miami Chorale (Opera by Thomas Sleeper). December 2002. Albany Records.

Love of My Soul - University of Miami Chorale. June 2002. Albany Records.

Ave Maria Mass by Steven Edwards, University Chorale and London Sinfonia. Produced by Steven Edwards and Albany Records. November 2001

Sampler CD – For Walton Music Corporation. 2000, 2001, 2002, 2003.

Blue – Symphony Number 1 by James Syler, University Chorale and Wind Ensemble. Produced by Albany Records. May 2001.

Forbidden Fire – The Choral/Orchestral Music of Robert Xavier Rodriguez. March 2001. Produced by Albany Records.

Christmas with the Empire Brass – Master Chorale of Tampa Bay – Carlos Brass Selections by Monteverdi, Gabriel, Chilcott, Whitacre and others. Produced by Sound Mirror. November 2000.

Voices and Light - featuring works of Conte, Clausen, Lauridsen, Gower and Descedos. July 1996. Produced by Albany Records.

Brahms: Ein deutsches Requiem - University of Miami Chorale. June 1996. Cane Records.

Noche Buena - Spanish Christmas Carols produced and distributed by ANS Records, Alex Selasco producer, José Silva, Music Arranger. Featuring members of the University of Miami Chorale

Sing Out with Joy - University of Miami Abend Kammerchor, (selected students from the University of Miami choral program) - August 1994. Produced by CPP/Belwin, Inc.

Songs of Innocence - Northern Arizona University Chorale, featuring works of Peter Eben, Stephen Chatman, William Grant Still, and Edwin Fissinger. July 1993. NACM 09

With a Whisper - Northern Arizona University Chorale, featuring works of David Conte, Kenneth Leighton, Alfred Desenclos, and Johannes Brahms. June 1992. NACM 06

Walk as Children - Northern Arizona University Chorale, featuring works by Giovanni Palestrina, Francis Poulenc, Johann Kuhnau, and John Paynter. June 1991. NACM 05

Remembrances - Northern Arizona University Chorale, featuring works of Frank Martin, René Clausen, Tomás de Victoria, Conrad Suza, and Johann Sebastian Bach. June 1990. NACM 03

Choral Music - Northern Arizona University Chorale and Chamber Singers. Music of Paul Hindemith, Clement Janequin, Olivier Messiaen, Knut Nystedt, and Sid Robinovich. June 1989. NACM 01

United We Stand - University of Miami Chorale Students, published and distributed by Winter Night Publishing. June 1994.

Morning Star - Northern Arizona University Chorale, Men's Chorale, and Choral Union, Christmas Music. December 1992. NACM 08

Simple Graces - Northern Arizona University Chorale, and Choral Union, Christmas Music. December 1990. NACM 04

Merry Christmas - Northern Arizona University Chorale, and Choral Union, Christmas Music. December 1989. NACM 02
