= Alexander Beridze =

Alexander Beridze ალექსანდრე ბერიძე
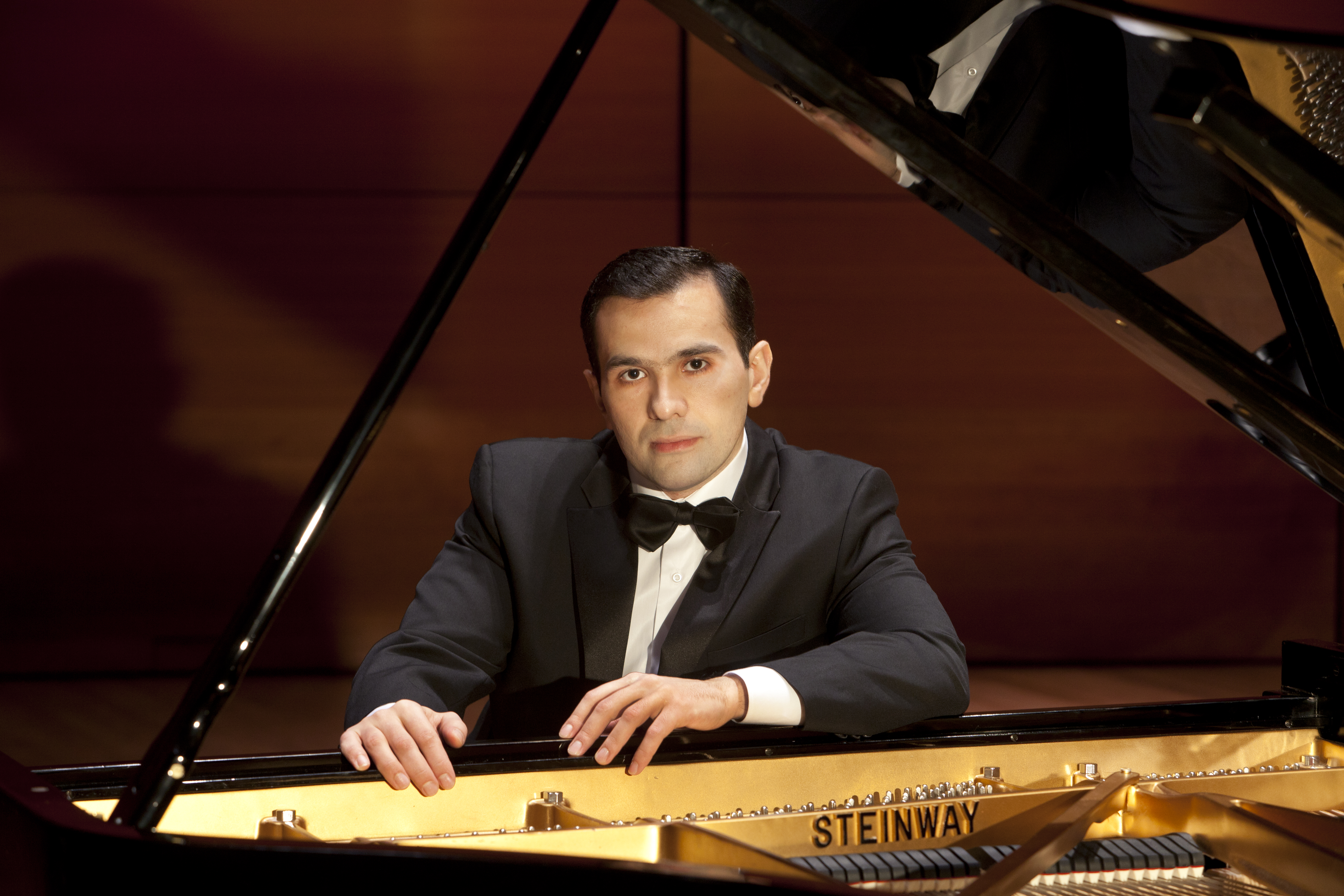
- Alexander Beridze, pianist

Background information
- Born: 29 June 1980
- Origin: Tbilisi, Georgia
- Genres: Classical music
- Occupations: Pianist, teacher
- Instrument: Piano
- Years active: 2009–present
- Label: NY Classics

Alexander Beridze (Georgian: ალექსანდრე ბერიძე) is a Georgian classical pianist, and founder and artistic director of the New York Piano Festival. He won the gold medal at the 53rd (2009) World Piano Competition at age 29. In 2011, Beridze performed in recital at Alice Tully Hall in New York City. His performances have been broadcast in the United States, the Republic of Georgia, Russia and 54 other countries.

== Early life and studies ==
Beridze was born in Tbilisi (Georgia). His mother, Manana Begiashvili, was a journalist who influenced him to write and bought him his first piano. He earned degrees in both international journalism at Tbilisi State University and Piano Performance from Tbilisi State Conservatoire.His teacher was Edisher Rusishvili. He is the author of over 500 articles as a music correspondent for Kviris Palitra, a Georgian newspaper, and interviewed famous performers and conductors, such as Mstislav Rostropovich, Maxim Vengerov, Yuri Bashmet, and Genadi Rojdestvensky. He came to America in 2004 at the invitation of Vladimir Feltsman following his first prize award at the Jacob Flier Competition. He studied with Feltsman at the Mannes College The New School for Music. At Mason Gross School of the Arts at Rutgers, State University of New Jersey, he was awarded a Doctorate of Musical Arts.

== Career ==
Beridze performed concertos with the major orchestras in Georgia, including the Tbilisi State, Georgia National Symphonies, and the State Opera and Ballet Symphony. In 2004, he made his United States debut as soloist at the Gala Concert with the Hudson Valley Orchestra at the Piano Summer in New Paltz, New York, conducted by Vladimir Feltsman. He performed a recital at Alice Tully Hall at Lincoln Center on April 19, 2011, as the gold medalist of the World Piano Competition. On Nov. 12, 2014 the Coudert Institute sponsored his recital at Weill Recital Hall at Carnegie Hall. He has performed in Steinway Hall, New York, in Harris Hall, Aspen, Colorado, and in chamber concerts with Yehuda Hanani in Palm Beach, Florida. He frequently performs as the New York Duo with his wife, Japanese pianist Mai Kagaya.

== Awards ==
Beridze won the gold medal in the 53rd World Piano Competition. In 2004, he won the Jacob Flier International Piano Competition. In addition to winning may of the top Georgian piano competitions, he won Presidential Grants from the Republic of Georgia for an outstanding musical career (2001 and 2005). He received the Vladimir Spivakov Award in 2003.

== Teaching career and charitable foundations ==
Beridze teaches at the Center of Musical Excellence in Manhattan. He is the founder of the New York Piano Festival, as well as the artistic director. In 2014, he was an artist in residence at the Shepherd School of Music at Rice University. He is the President of the New York Music Foundation Inc., a not for profit 501 C 3 that he started in 2014. He has organized and performed in charity concerts to help children in Georgia, Russia and America, supporting the Sloan Kettering Cancer Center and Downside Up, a Russian non-profit organization, which provides support for families of children with Down syndrome.

== Recordings ==
- 2014: CD: Alexander Beridze: Beethoven:Sonata No. 28 in A Major, Op. 101; Brahms: Two Rhapsodies, No. 1 in B Minor, Op. 79 Schumann: Kreisleriana, Op. 16. NYClassics
