= Zoe Zeniodi =

Greek conductor and pianist

Zoe Zeniodi Ζωή Ζενιώδη
- Born: 13 February 1976 (age 50); Athens, Greece
- Genres: Classical
- Occupations: Conductor, pianist, accompanist
- Instrument: Piano
- Years active: 1995–present
- Website: zoezeniodi.com

Zoe Zeniodi (Greek: Ζωή Ζενιώδη, born 13 February 1976) is a conductor from Greece. She is currently the Artistic Director of El Sistema Greece. She is the first woman conductor to ever perform with Opera Southwest. She has been selected by the Dallas Opera for the residency of the Institute of Women Conductors, 2016. and a Taki Alsop Conducting Fellowship Mentee.

Zoe Zeniodi, hailed by the press as “Ms Dynamite”, has an international career which has led her to collaborations with Lyric Opera of Chicago, Philharmonia Orchestra, Orchestre de Paris, Santa Fe Opera, Opera Queensland, New Zealand Opera, Opera Southwest, Florida Grand Opera, Gürzenich-Orchester, Orchestre National Avignon-Provence, Orchestre de Chambre de Paris, among others. She has conducted in venues such as the Paris Philharmonie, Teatro Colón and Carnegie Hall and has conducted orchestras such as the Buenos Aires Philharmonic, Auckland Philharmonia Orchestra, Orchestra Wellington, Christchurch Symphony Orchestra, Bremer Philharmoniker, National Symphony Orchestra of Colombia, Cyprus, Tatarstan and Vietnam, Bogota Philharmonic, Olympia Symphony Orchestra, Brno Philharmonic and has collaborated with artists like Stephen Hough, Vadim Gluzman and Lise de la Salle.

Zeniodi was recently a semi-finalist in the La Maestra Competition in Philharmonie de Paris where she was chosen by the jury as one of the six women worldwide to be a member of La Maestra Academy with engagements and professional support for 2022-2024.

== Musical studies ==
Zeniodi holds a Doctor of Musical Arts in orchestral conducting from the University of Miami and also studied at the Royal College of Music and the Mozarteum, Salzburg. In an interview to Classical 95.5 FM Radio in March 2017, Zeniodi expressed her close affiliation with American contemporary composer Thomas Sleeper, under whom Zeniodi undertook her early conducting studies and whose work she later championed.

== Early career ==
Zeniodi started her early musical career performing as a piano accompanist, mainly in Europe. After her transition to conducting, Zeniodi conducted opera and ballet productions at the Florida Grand Opera, the Greek National Opera, the Onassis Cultural Center, the Festival of the Aegean and the University of Miami. As a guest conductor, she has worked with the Brno Philharmonic, the Tatarstan National Symphony Orchestra, the New Philharmonic Orchestra of Florida, the Pan-European Philharmonia, the Palm Beach Symphony, the Greek-Turkish Youth Orchestra, the National Radio Symphony Orchestra of Greece, the Kamerata/Armonia Atenea, the Florida Youth Orchestra, the Greater Miami Youth Symphony among others. She was also the artistic Director of the Organization of the Thessaloniki Concert Hall.

== Recent career ==
Zeniodi made her debut in New Zealand in 2021, with Opera New Zealand in the production of Mozart's Le Nozze di Figaro", a production which was postponed for a year due to COVID-19 pandemic. Zeniodi made her Australian debut in 2022, conducting the Queensland Symphony Orchestra for Poulenc's La voix humaine with Alexandra Flood, and the world premiere of The Call (based on the story "A Phone Call" by Auburn Sandstrom on The Moth) with Ali McGregor. Zeniodi returned to Queensland for a production of Cosi fan tutte with the Opera Queensland in 2023. She had her debut in Teatro Colon performing Giya Kancheli 's Symphony No4, among other works, on 16 June 2023. Zeniodi has been announced to have her debut in Sydney Opera House in the summer of 2024, to perform Mozart's Cosi fan tutte.

== Recordings ==
Zeniodi has released three commercial recordings on the Albany Records to critical acclaim: Thomas Sleeper's Translucence (Brno Philharmonic) and XENIA (Frost Symphony Orchestra), as well as Frank Ticheli's An American Dream (Frost Symphony Orchestra). She also released ThivaKm102 with the ARTéfacts Ensemble (Puzzlemusik) and Thomas Sleeper's Through a Glass darkly with the 21st Ensemble (Uroboros Music).

== Reviews ==
"Zeniodi coolly rose to the occasion, drawing stupendous playing from the students of the university's Frost Symphony Orchestra ... Zeniodi drew maximum tension from the opening sequences, bringing the quiet dreamlike section to a great climax. In Shostakovich's Ballet Suite No. 1, Zeniodi drew some of the best playing the orchestra has ever produced. Ensemble playing was knife-edge precise." – South Florida Classical Review, David Fleshler, 22 November 2009

== In film ==
Zeniodi's life and career was a focus of the documentary film La Maestra (2023), by American actress and director Maggie Contreras. The documentary film follows five international women who participate in 'La Maestra', which, at the time of filming, was the only top-level competition in the world for female only orchestra conductors. Zeniodi took place in the Maestra competition in Paris in March 2022. The documentary film aimed to challenge the societal views on conducting being a male-dominated profession The film drew comparisons with the psychological drama film Tár. However, La Maestra offers directs insights into the "normality" of lives of women conductors. For example Zeniodi is depicted playing with her children, waving the conductor's battons like magic wands, whereas Contreras argued that the documentary aimed to break free from the stereotype of the authoritarian character that belittles musicians. Acclaimed women conductors like Marin Alsop make an appearance on the film and join the discourse on the life of a woman conductor. The film made its world premiere at the Tribeca Film Festival in May 2023 and received positive reviews and the festival's second Audience Award.
