= Bantz =

Bantz is a surname. Notable people with the surname include:

- Fred A. Bantz (1895–1982), American official in the United States Department of the Navy
- Helmut Bantz (1921–2004), German gymnast and Olympic champion
- Brandon Bantz (born 1987), American baseball catcher
- Jeffri W. Bantz (1954–2006), American classical conductor and teacher
- Bantz John Craddock (born 1949), United States Army general
