= Frank Warren O'Reilly =

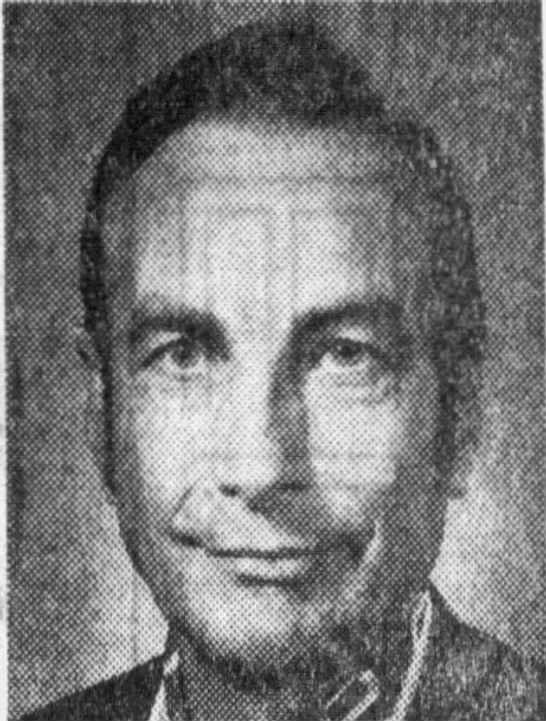
Frank Warren O'Reilly

Frank Warren O'Reilly (1921–2001) was a gay activist and founder of the Charles Ives Festival in Miami and of the Chopin Foundation.

== Biography ==
F. Warren O'Reilly served during World War II and attended New York City College.

He was the music editor for The Miami News in the 1970s. In this capacity he organized the Charles Ives Festival in 1973. He assembled a Festival Committee that included Leonard Bernstein, Leopold Stokowski, Lou Harrison, and John Cage.

O'Reilly was adjunct professor at the University of Miami School of Music and president and executive director of The Chopin Foundation of the United States.

He is buried at Congressional Cemetery, Washington, D.C. His tombstone reads: A Gay WWII Veteran. F. Warren O'Reilly, Ph.D., 1921–2001, During my eventful lifetime the only honest and truthful ending of the Pledge of Allegiance was "... with Liberty and Justice for SOME".

The F. Warren O'Reilly papers, 1922-2001 are hosted at the University of Miami, Special Collections.
