= Thomas Sleeper =

American classical composer (1956–2022)

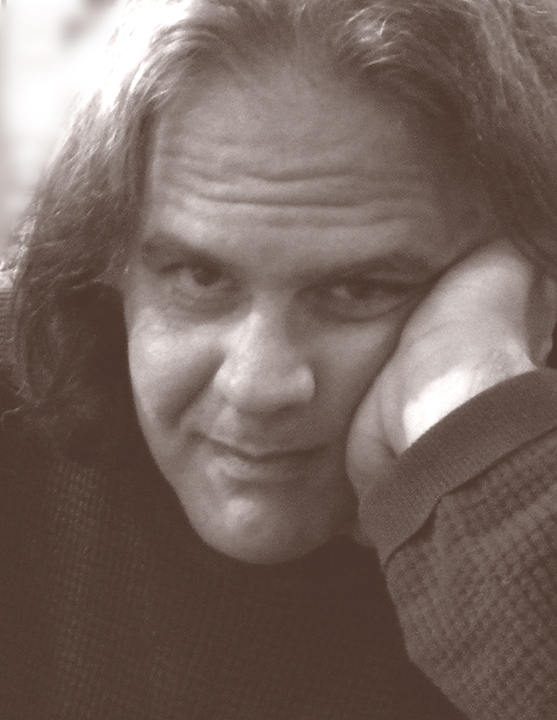
- Born: February 16, 1956; Wagoner, Oklahoma, U.S.
- Died: October 15, 2022 (aged 66)
- Occupation: Composer
- Years active: 1975–2022

Thomas M. Sleeper (February 16, 1956 – October 15, 2022) was an American composer and conductor. He was the Orchestra Conductor at Stetson University in DeLand, Florida from 1985 to 1993, and Director of Orchestral Activities and Conductor of the University of Miami Frost Symphony Orchestra until his retirement in 2018. He was also the director of the Florida Youth Orchestra from 1993 to 2020.

== History ==
Sleeper was born in Wagoner, Oklahoma, and was a member of the Cherokee Nation. He received his Bachelor of Music at the University of Texas, and subsequently received his Master of Music at Southern Methodist University, where he studied under Daryl F. Rauscher of the Dallas Symphony Orchestra and James Rives-Jones. From 1975 to 1978, while in Austin, Sleeper was active with an avant-garde group of composer/performers called "Fermata". As a member of "Fermata" he worked with composers such as Jerry Willingham, Jerry Hunt and Robert Xavier Rodriguez. In 1978 Sleeper was appointed Associate Conductor of the Dallas Civic Symphony. Following his conducting stint with the Dallas Civic Symphony, Sleeper began to compose many pieces of music including, but not limited to, operas, concerti, symphonies, solo and chamber music.

Sleeper was a frequent guest conductor all over the world and performed with ensembles such as the Central Philharmonic of China (where he gave the Chinese premiere of Mahler's Symphony No. 5 in 1992), Argentina's San Juan Symphony Orchestra, and Bulgaria's Ruse State Philharmonic. In addition, he was named the Artistic Advisor of the China-Wuhan Symphony in 1993 where he gave the Chinese premiere of Brahms' 2nd Piano Concerto with soloist Justin Blasdale. Sleeper was an advocate of new music, and has commissioned and conducted the premieres of works of composers including Roberto Sierra, Thomas Ludwig, Henry Brant, Carlos Surinach, and Robert Xavier Rodriguez. He later lived in Miami, Florida.

In April 2019, Sleeper was diagnosed with amyotrophic lateral sclerosis. He died due to complications from the disease on October 15, 2022, at the age of 66.

== Notable works ==
- Einstein's Inconsistency, a series of eight operas that get progressively shorter (roughly following a reverse Fibonacci series) and may be recombined in any order or number creating a new overall structure. Composed 2014.
- Symphony No. 5 "chamber symphony", premiered April 2015 at the University of Miami Frost School of Music, Gary Green, conductor.
- Symphony No. 4, premiered October 2015 with the Meadows Symphony Orchestra, Paul Phillips, conductor.
- Sonata for Piano and Alto Saxophone (Seven Deadly Sins), 2014, written for pianist Santiago Rodriguez and saxophonist Dale Underwood. Premiered December 7, 2014.
- Symphony No. 3 "ex nihilo", premiered February 2014 by the United States Navy Band, Captain Brian O. Walden, conductor. The work is dedicated to Dr. William Hipp, Dean Emeritus of the Frost School of Music.
- Hetaera esmeralda, 2014, written for Greek pianist/conductor Zoe Zeniodi. Premiere by Zeniodi with the Alhambra Orchestra, April 30, 2014, with the composer conducting.
- Symphony No. 2 "Little Leylie", premiered in November 2012 in Dania, Florida, by the Florida Youth Orchestra.
- Thomas Ludwig Violin Concerto, premiered by Thomas Sleeper with the Miami University Symphony Orchestra.
- Violin Concerto No. 2, written for UK violinist Hugo Ticciati and Greek conductor Zoe Zeniodi. Premiered in the Casa dei Mezzo Music Festival on Crete, June 2013.
- Concerto for Flute and Flute Orchestra, commissioned by Trudy Kane and the Frost Flute Orchestra. Premiered in November 2012 in Miami, Florida, with Trudy Kane, soloist, and Andrés Jiamie, conductor.
- Concerto for Violin and Orchestra, "Hypnagogia", for violin and orchestra, commissioned by the Greater Miami Youth Orchestra. Premiered in March 2012 in Miami, Florida, with Huifang Chen, soloist and Andrés Jiamie, conductor. The work was later recorded with the Brno Philharmonic and soloist Huifang Chen.
- PARALLAX for euphonium and wind ensemble, written for and premiered by Timothy Shade, Wichita, Kansas, September 2011.
- Parallages, for solo piano, written for Greek pianist Zoe Zeniodi. Premiered in the Casa dei Mezzo Music Festival on Crete, June 25, 2011.
- Through a Glass Darkly for soprano and orchestra, written for soprano Irini Kyriakidou, conductor Zoe Zeniodi and the Broward Symphony Orchestra. Premiered in Bailey Hall on February 26, 2011. Recorded by the United States Navy Band, Brian O. Walden, conductor, in 2012.
- Concerto for Alto Saxophone and Orchestra, written for and premiered by Dale Underwood with the Florida Youth Orchestra, Zoe Zeniodi, conductor, in Bailey Hall, November 2010, and in the chamber version for 9 instruments with Ensemble 21 under the direction of Zoe Zeniodi, February 23, 2011. Recorded by the United States Navy Band, Brian O. Walden, conductor, in 2012.
- XENIA for tenor and orchestra, based on texts by Jane Alison from her novel The Love-Artist. Premiered by John Duykers and the Frost Symphony Orchestra with conductor Zoe Zeniodi in Gusman Hall on February 20, 2010.
- Translucence for trombone and orchestra, premiered by Timothy Conner and the Frost Symphony Orchestra with conductor Zoe Zeniodi in Gusman Hall on March 7, 2009.
- String Quartet No. 3, written for and premiered by the Delray String Quartet, February 2009.
- The Sisters Antipodes, a short opera written in conjunction with Australian author Jane Alison and visual artist Sherri Tan, premiered November 2009.
- Concerto for Cello and Orchestra, premiered by Jillian Bloom at Carnegie Hall on March 23, 2008. The work was later recorded by Jennifer Culp with the Brno Philharmonic.
- Concerto for Trumpet, premiered by Craig Morris, former principal trumpet of the Chicago Symphony Orchestra.
- String Quartet No. 2, "Bergonzi", written for the Bergonzi String Quartet.
- Aceldama: Field of Blood, an opera performed throughout the world.
- Symphony No. 1, premiered and recorded by the Meadows Symphony Orchestra in Dallas, Paul Phillips, conductor.
- Concerto for Bassoon and Orchestra, written for bassoonist Kathryn Sleeper.
- Adagio for Orchestra
- Piano Concerto No. 2, premiered by pianist Justin Blasdale.
- One Water, documentary film score
- The Silver Mirror, documentary film score

== Discography ==
- Thomas Sleeper: Through a Glass Darkly: Adagio from Symphony No. 1, Through a Glass Darkly, Finale from The Silver Mirror, Symphony No. 4, Uroboros Music, 2016, Thomas M. Sleeper (composer)
- Sleeper: Four Concerti, Albany Records, 2014 (TROY 1475), Thomas M. Sleeper (composer)
- Thomas Sleeper: Music for Flute: Concerto for Flute and Flute Orchestra, Four miniatures for Bassoon and Flute, Xandre, Uroboros Music, 2013, Thomas M. Sleeper (composer)
- Sleeper: Symphony No. 1, XENIA, Six Arias for Cello and Orchestra, Albany Records, 2010 (TROY 1212), Thomas M. Sleeper (composer)
- Maslanka, Sleeper: Reflections: Concerto for Trumpet, Naxos Records, 2007, Thomas M. Sleeper (composer)
- Rodríguez: Works For Chorus and Orchestra, Albany Records, 2001, Thomas M. Sleeper (conductor)
- Surinach: Symphonic Melismas, Double Concerto, etc., Centaur Records, 1996 (conductor)
- Aceldama, Albany Records (composer, conductor)
- Ticheli, Van Der Slice, Sleeper: Orchestral Works, Albany Records (composer, conductor)
- Works of Finzi, Brahms, R. Strauss, Centaur Records (conductor)
