= Aaron Rosand =

American violinist (1927–2019)

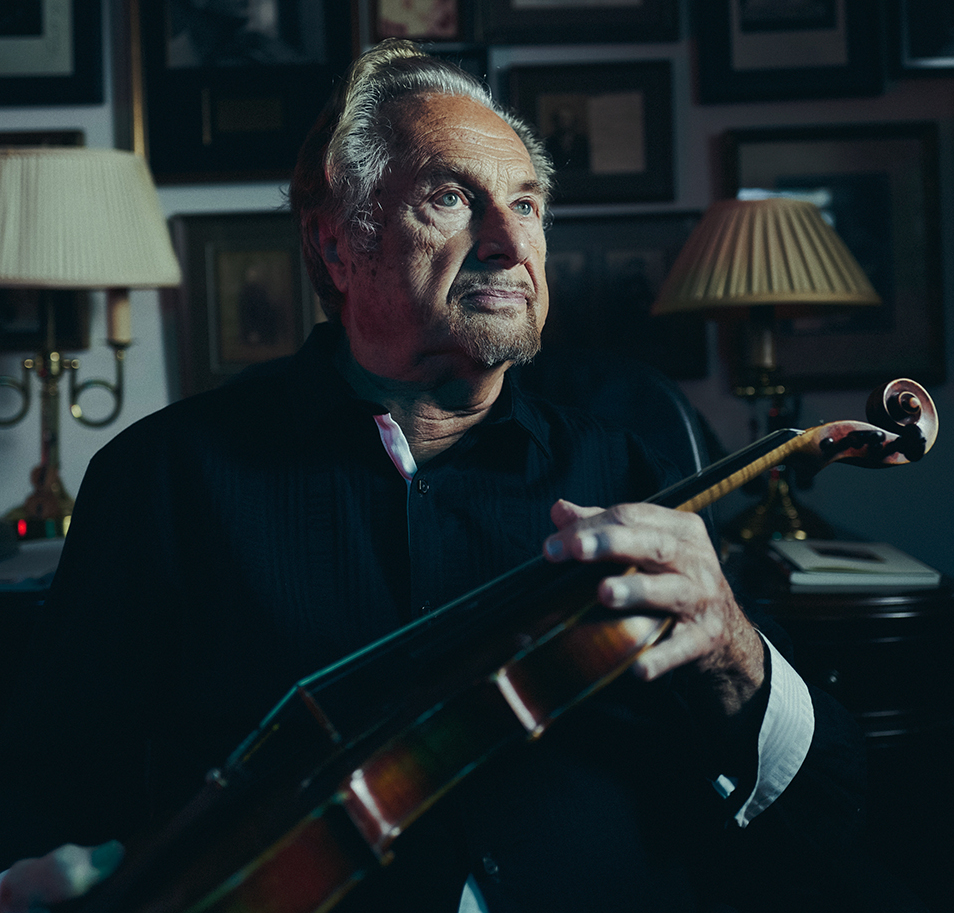
- Rosand in 2016

Background information
- Born: Aaron Rosen; March 15, 1927; Hammond, Indiana, U.S.
- Died: July 9, 2019 (aged 92) White Plains, New York, U.S.
- Genres: Classical
- Occupations: violinist; pedagogue
- Instrument: Violin
- Years active: 1945–2019
- Labels: AudioFon; Biddulph; Columbia; RCA; Vox

Aaron Rosand (born Aaron Rosen; March 15, 1927 – July 9, 2019) was an American classical violinist and violin pedagogue.

== Life and career ==
Born in Hammond, Indiana, he studied with Leon Sametini at the Chicago Musical College and with Efrem Zimbalist at the Curtis Institute of Music, where he taught from 1981 until his death. Critics noted his tone and interpretations of romantic repertoire. He recorded extensively and performed internationally with major orchestras and concert organizations.

In the 1960s he performed often at Butler University's Festival of Neglected Romantic Music, resurrecting works that had not been heard in decades and helping spearhead the Romantic Revival in music.

In an April 1970 review in The New York Times, critic Harold C. Schonberg wrote of Rosand that "Romanticism on the violin had a rebirth last night in Carnegie Hall." In the 1970s he also completed three acclaimed tours of Southern Africa.

In October 2009, he sold his 1741 Guarneri del Gesù violin (previously owned by Paul Kochanski), which he had purchased in 1957 from the widow of Kochanski, to a Russian businessman for around US$10 million. This was believed to be the highest price ever paid for a violin, and Rosand donated $1.5 million to the Curtis Institute of Music.

Rosand had a number of students, including Benjamin Schmid, Alexander Kerr, Stephanie Jeong, Yu-Chien Tseng, Richard Lin, Dami Kim, Benjamin Bowman, Ray Chen, David Coucheron, David Gale, Roslyn Huang, Victor Zeyu Li, Asi Matathias, Desirée Ruhstrat and Stephen Waarts.

Rosand died on July 9, 2019, aged 92.
