= Don't Blame Me (Dorothy Fields and Jimmy McHugh song) =

1932 jazz song

"Don't Blame Me" is a popular song with music by Jimmy McHugh and lyrics by Dorothy Fields. The song was part of the 1932 show Clowns in Clover and was published in 1933. Popular versions that year were recorded by: Ethel Waters (US No. 6), Guy Lombardo, and Charles Agnew.

== Later recordings ==
- It was a No. 21 hit for Nat King Cole in 1948.
- The song received two significant "rock era" remakes: a ballad version by the Everly Brothers in 1961 which reached No. 20 on Billboard, and an up-tempo version by Frank Ifield which reached No. 8 on the UK Singles Chart on 15 February 1964, as well as in New Zealand. In the U.S., Ifield's version reached No. 128.

== Other recordings ==
- Charles Agnew and his Hotel Stevens Orchestra (1933). The New Yorker magazine reviewed this recording as "richly played."
- Ethel Waters with the Dorsey Brothers Orchestra – 1933
- Teddy Wilson – 1937
- Nat "King" Cole October 1938, July 1944, November 21, 1944, May 19, 1945, July 14, 1955
- Perry Como's earliest known recording of the song was broadcast Monday, May 3, 1943 from New York City as part of Columbia Presents Perry Como. He recorded the song as part of a Chesterfield Supper Club program in 1945 or 1946 that was rebroadcast by the AFRS as AFRS Supper Club #283.
- Coleman Hawkins with Teddy Wilson – 1944
- Peggy Lee - 1945
- Charlie Parker - 1947
- Andy Russell with Dean Elliott and His Orchestra - Love Notes From Andy Russell (1948)
- Shep Fields with his New Music Orchestra – (RCA Victor, 1948)
- J. J. Johnson – 1949
- Bing Crosby recorded the song in 1956 for use on his radio show. It was included in the box set The Bing Crosby CBS Radio Recordings (1954–56) issued by Mosaic in 2009.
- Johnnie Ray Johnnie Ray with The Buddy Cole Quartet, (Columbia Records CL-6199, 1952) Following "Whiskey & Gin" & the smash "Cry," his first two hit singles released on Okeh in 1951, "Don't Blame Me" was the first of eight sides of Johnnie Ray's debut album for Columbia in 1952
- Sammy Davis Jr. - It's All Over but the Swingin' (1957)
- Yusuf Lateef – Eastern Sounds (1962)
- Thelonious Monk – Criss Cross (1963)
- Duke Jordan with Sam Jones and Al Foster (1975)
- Steve Grossman with Michel Petrucciani – Steve Grossman Quartet with Michel Petrucciani (1999)
- Terence Blanchard with Cassandra Wilson – Let's Get Lost (2001)

== Popular culture ==
- The song was performed in a restaurant scene with Albert Finney and Diane Keaton in the 1982 film Shoot the Moon.

== See also ==
- List of 1930s jazz standards
