= Edwin R. Fissinger =

American composer, conductor (1920-1990)

Edwin R. Fissinger (June 15, 1920, Chicago, Illinois – October 16, 1990, Fargo, North Dakota) was an American composer and conductor.

== Early years ==
Edwin Russell Fissinger was the fifth of nine children born to Paul and Isabel Fissinger in Chicago, Illinois.

He grew up in Rockford, Illinois, and attended Rockford High School where he was on the track team and ran the fastest 440 in the school's history. It was also in Rockford where Fissinger received his early musical training.

In the fall of 1938, Fissinger entered Marquette University on a track scholarship. During his freshman year, he opted not to return to college the following year in order to concentrate on music.

In 1939 he reorganized “Eddie Fissinger’s Orchestra” for which he served as pianist and arranger, writing original compositions and arrangements for the group. Fissinger also sang and played the piano for his local radio program at WROK in Rockford, “The Voice of Ed Fissinger.” In 1940, he joined the Charlie Agnew Orchestra. For the next two years he traveled as a singer, pianist, and arranger.

In 1941 he enlisted in the Air Force. He married singer Patty Morgan on February 27, 1943. In 1944, after a brief tour with the Seventh Air Force in the Central Pacific, Fissinger became the first World War II veteran to enter the American Conservatory of Music. and received both his bachelor’s and master’s degrees. He specialized in composition and studied under eminent composer, Leo Sowerby. He earned his doctorate from the University of Illinois Urbana-Champaign in 1965, where, in addition to studies in music literature and conducting, he studied musicology with Dragan Plamenac. His thesis title was: "Selected Choral Works of Antonio Caldara."

== Career ==
Fissinger’s career began at the American Conservatory of Music where he was director of the choir and instructor from 1947 to 1954. He then was a graduate assistant in music theory at the University of Illinois from 1954 to 1957. From 1957 until coming to North Dakota State University in 1967 he was chairman of the music department and director of the choir and madrigal singers at the University of Illinois at Chicago Circle.

At North Dakota State University, Fissinger was chairman of the music department and served as the director of the Concert Choir and Madrigal Singers. In 1970, under his guidance, music department earned accreditation from the National Association of Schools of Music. Fissinger was also instrumental in the construction of the $6 million Music Education Center, dedicated in 1982.

From 1958 to 1962 he was consulting editor for Summary-Birchard Publishing Co. Beginning in 1967, he was editor of the Parkway Choral Series of contemporary choral music for World Library Publications.

In 1973, 1977, and 1983 the NDSU Concert Choir, under his direction, was selected to perform at the opening session of the National Convention of the American Choral Directors Association.

In 1977 Fissinger received the NDSU Blue Key Doctor of Service award.

He retired in 1985 and continued composing until his death in Fargo on October 16, 1990.
