= Richard Todd (horn player) =

French horn player from California

Richard Todd is a French horn player from California. He has worked in jazz, classical, and pop music.

== Career ==
A native of Placentia, California, Todd attended El Dorado High School, graduating in 1973. He has recorded over 1000 motion picture soundtracks and has recorded with Frank Sinatra, Barbra Streisand, Madonna, Clark Terry, Ray Brown, and Woody Herman. He won the gold medal at the 1980 Concours Internationale Toulon and the Pro Musicis International Foundation Award. He has been a member of the Los Angeles Chamber Orchestra and has taught at the University of Miami Frost School of Music.

== Discography ==
- New Ideas (GM, 1985)
- Rickter Scale (GM, 1990)
- With a Twist (RCM, 2002)
- Rhapsody for Horn and Orchestra with San Luis Obispo Symphony (Naxos, 2003)
