= Jorge Mejia =

American musician and company executive

- Born: Jorge Andres Mejia; October 27, 1972; Bogotá, Colombia
- Citizenship: United States
- Education: New World School of the Arts, New England Conservatory of Music, University of Miami Frost School of Music (BM, Piano Performance, cum laude)
- Occupations: Classical Pianist, Composer, and Music Industry Executive
- Years active: 1997- present
- Employer: Sony Music Publishing
- Known for: Classical Composition, Piano Performance, and as a Music Executive
- Notable work: "Prelude in F Major for Piano and Orchestra" from An Open Book: A Memoir in Music (Nominated for Best Classical Contemporary Composition at 2018 Latin Grammy Awards)
- Title: President & CEO of Sony Music Publishing - Latin America & US Latin
- Board member of: New World Symphony Board of Trustees, Frost School of Music Dean's Advisory Board
- Spouse: Amanda Mejia
- Awards: Billboard Latin Power Player 2010, 2011, 2015, 2016, 2017, 2018, 2019, 2020, 2021, 2022, 2023, 2024, 2025 Billboard Power 100 List 2022, 2024, 2025 Billboard International Power Player 2021, 2023, 2024 Billboard Global Power Player 2025 Premio Editores Ralph S. Peer Award (Latin Songwriters Hall of Fame) Distinguished Alumnus Award (Frost School of Music)
- Honours: Steinway Artist, Billboard's 40 Under 40 List
- Website: https://www.jorgemejiamusic.com/

Jorge Andres Mejia (born October 27, 1972) is a Colombian-born American composer, pianist, singer-songwriter and music industry executive. He was nominated for a Latin Grammy Award in 2018 for "Prelude in F Major for Piano and Orchestra" from An Open Book: A Memoir in Music. Jorge is currently President & CEO at Sony Music Publishing for Latin America and U.S. Latin. He is an alum of the New World School of the Arts, the New England Conservatory of Music, and the University of Miami, from which he is a Distinguished Alumni.

== Early life and education ==
Mejia was born October 27, 1972, in Bogotá, Colombia, but grew up in Miami, Florida. Jorge studied piano performance first at the New World School of the Arts, then at the New England Conservatory of Music, eventually transferring to the University of Miami where he graduated cum laude with a B.M. in piano performance.

== Professional ==
In 1997, Jorge joined Sony as an intern and rose steadily in the ranks to become President in 2016 and President & CEO in 2019 for Sony Music Publishing Latin America and U.S. Latin. Sony Music Publishing is the largest publishing corporation in the world, following Sony's merger with EMI Music Publishing in 2012, currently owning or administering more than 6 million copyrights.

Under Mejia's leadership, Sony Music Publishing Latin America and U.S. Latin divisions won the so-called "Triple Crown" in 2016, 2017, and 2018- simultaneously winning the ASCAP, SESAC and BMI "Publisher of the Year" at the three major performing rights organizations' Latin award events. In addition, Sony Music's Latin publishing division has won 19 ASCAP Latin Publisher of the Year wins, 12 Billboard Latin Publishing Corporation of the Year awards, BMI Latin Publisher of the Year, and SESAC Latin Publisher of the Year awards, including in 2025 when Sony Music Publishing Latin won at BMI and SESAC Latin as "Publisher of the Year".

Mejia is a member of the Board of Trustees at the New World Symphony (orchestra) and the Advisory Board at the University of Miami's Frost School of Music.

== Music ==
Mejia is a classical pianist and composer as well as singer-songwriter and founder of the band, The Green Room. He is also a Steinway Artist. Mejia's latest release, "If These Walls Could Talk," a composition for piano, was released in 2022 via Sony Music Latin. He recorded an orchestral version of this piano concerto in three movements with the London Symphony Orchestra, a project which was released on April 24, 2026 and debuted at #7 in the Apple Music Classical Top 100 chart.

His second release, An Open Book: A Memoir in Music, consists of an eBook and orchestral recording, which was recorded with the University of Miami's Henry Mancini Institute Orchestra and released via Sony Music Latin May 4, 2018. Prelude in F Major for Piano and Orchestra from An Open Book: A Memoir in Music was nominated in the Best Classical Contemporary Composition category for the 19th annual Latin Grammy Awards. El Nuevo Herald called An Open Book: A Memoir in Music "an instant classic...a rigorous and eclectic work." Mejia's album of original solo classical piano pieces, Preludes, was released June 26, 2015. Billboard called Mejia's Preludes "virtuoso, captivating pieces".

== Awards ==
Jorge Mejia was first recognized for his work as a music executive in 2011 as a Billboard Latin Power Player and has been recognized with this honor every year the award has been published (15 times), including in 2025. In 2012, Mejia was included on Billboard's 40 Under 40 list. He was awarded the "Premio Editores Ralph S. Peer" award from the Latin Songwriters Hall of Fame in 2016.

In 2020, the Frost School of Music at the University of Miami awarded Mejia with the school's most prestigious honor, the Distinguished Alumnas Award.

He was additionally recognized as a Billboard International Power Player in 2021, 2023, and 2024, and made it to Billboard's Power 100 List in 2022, 2024, and 2025. He was also included in Billboard's Global Power Player list in 2025.

== Personal life ==
Mejia married human rights activist, Amanda Parker, on October 27, 2012.
