= Élan Recordings =

- Founded: 1985
- Founder: Santiago Rodriguez and Natalia Rodriguez
- Genre: Classical
- Country of origin: United States
- Location: Riverdale, Maryland
- Official website: elanrecording.com

Élan Recordings is an independent record label specializing in classical music.

== History ==
Élan Recordings was established in 1985 by pianist Santiago Rodriguez and his wife, Natalia Rodriguez. The catalogue features numerous Spanish/Latin recordings. It also features a number of historic re-releases. Santiago Rodriguez records exclusively for Élan.

== Artists ==
- Santiago Rodriguez, pianist
- Carmen Balthrop, soprano
- Elias Barreiro, guitar
- Bibiano Borrato, guitar
- Rudolfo Brito, pianist
- Hsuan-Ya Chen, pianist
- Mark Clinton and Nicole Narboni, duo pianists
- Cuarteto Latinoamericano, string quartet
- Evelyn Garvey, fortepiano
- Jaemi Kim, pianist
- André Laplante, pianist
- Noel Lester, pianist
- Raymond Lewenthal, pianist
- Donald Manildi, pianist
- Elmar Oliveira, violinist
- Reubén Pelåez, pianist
- Nathaniel Rosen, cellist
- Thomas Schumaker, pianist
- Sofia Philharmonic Orchestra
- Earl Wild, pianist

== Sources ==
- Ashby. "Guide to Records: Santiago Rodriguez." American Record Guide, Jul/Aug 1994, Vol. 57 Issue n. 4, pg. 155.
- Cornelius, Stephen. "Pianist Searches For The Unexpected In The Music". Toledo Blade, September 27, 1996, p. 28
- Gerber, L. "A Conversation with Santiago Rodriguez." Fanfare, 1992, Vol. 15 Issue n. 3, pp. 107–11.
- Manildi, Donald. "Guide to Records: Santiago Rodriguez." American Record Guide, Jan/Feb 1995, Vol. 58 Issue n.1, p157.
- March, Ivan; Greenfield, Edward; Layton, Robert. The Penguin Guide to Recorded Classical Music 2010. Penguin, 2009
- McLellan, Joseph. "The Little Record Company That Could". Washington Post, April 1, 1990. (subscription required)
- McLellan, Joseph. "Some Big Names Fit Well on Small Labels". Washington Post, Nov. 6, 1994.
- McLellan, Joseph. "Santiago Rodriguez, Playing with Élan". Washington Post, June 7, 1998. (subscription required)
- Phillip, Scott. "Ginastera: Danzas Argentinas, Piano Sonata No. 1..." Fanfare, July 1, 2010.
