= Frost School of Music =

Music school of the University of Miami

Coordinates: 25°43′11″N 80°16′46″W

Location
- 1314 Miller Drive; Coral Gables, Florida, U.S.

Information
- School type: Private
- Established: 1926
- Dean: Shelly Berg
- Enrollment: 716
- Website: https://www.frost.miami.edu/

Phillip and Patricia Frost School of Music is the music school at the University of Miami in Coral Gables, Florida. From 1926 to 2003, it was known as University of Miami School of Music.

== Academics and programs ==
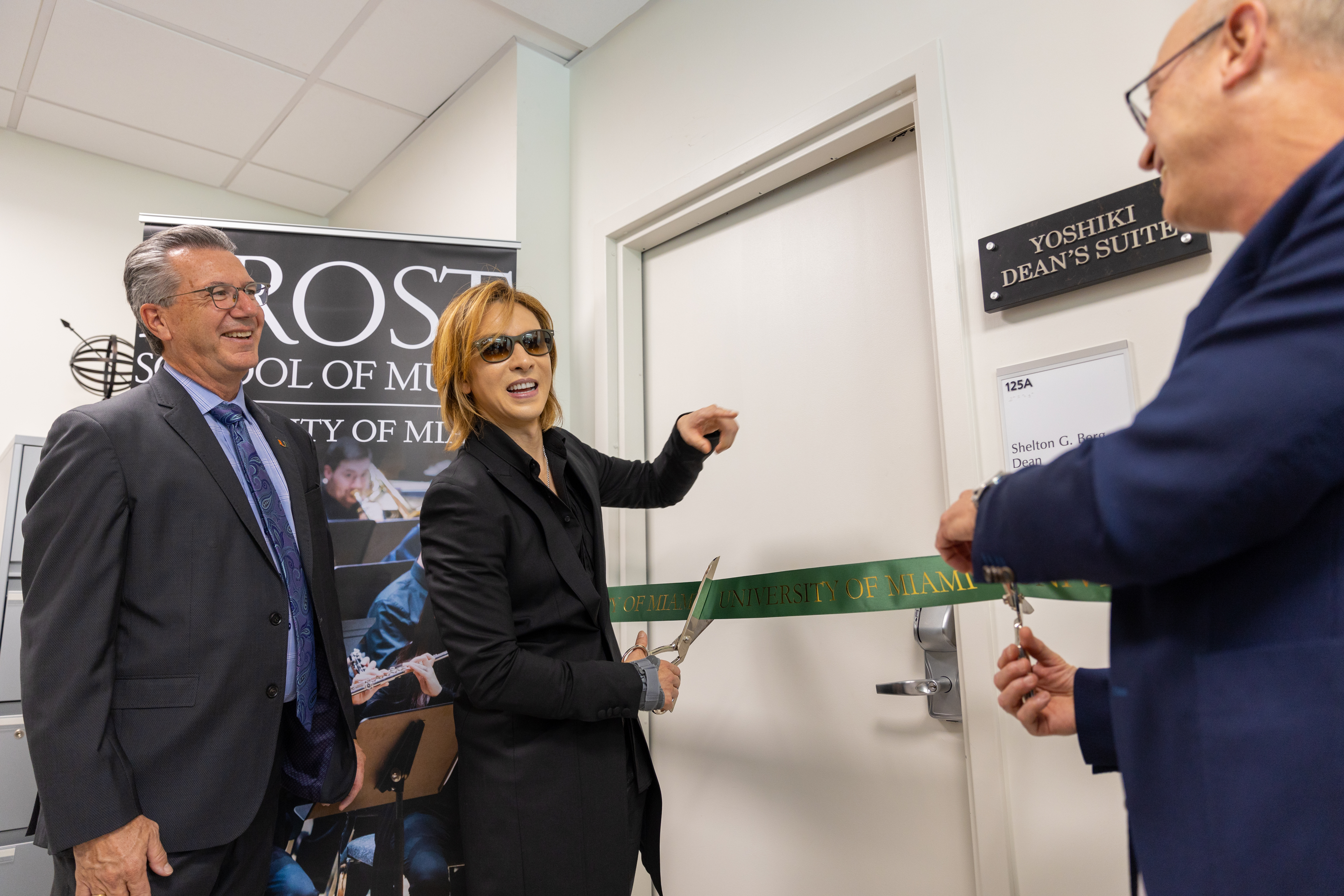
Japanese musician Yoshiki cuts the ribbon outside the newly established Yoshiki Dean's Suite at the Frost School of Music in June 2019

The University of Miami's Frost School of Music was one of the original schools of the University of Miami upon its 1926 founding, operating from 1926 until 2003 as University of Miami School of Music. The School today has an enrollment of just over 700 students.

In April 2007, Shelly Berg, American pianist, composer, arranger, orchestrator, and producer, was appointed as the new dean of the Frost School of Music following the retirement of James William Hipp.

The Frost School is home to Bruce Hornsby Creative American Music Program, named after Frost School of Music alumnus Bruce Hornsby. The program is an interdisciplinary course of study designed to develop artist and songwriters by immersing them in the diverse traditions that form the foundation of modern American songwriting. In 2019, Frost School of Music's Dean's Suite was named for Japanese rock star Yoshiki following a masterclass to Frost students and a charitable to donation to the school.

== Rankings and reputation ==
In 2018, Billboard magazine ranked the University of Miami's Frost School of Music as the nation's top music business school.

== Facilities ==
The University of Miami's Frost School of Music's facilities include the 600-seat Maurice Gusman Concert Hall named for Ukrainian-American businessman Maurice Gusman. The concert hall hosts performances by students, faculty, and guest artists.

Other school facilities include the 150-seat Victor E. Clarke Recital Hall, The Marta and L. Austin Weeks Music Library and Technology Center (opened in 2005), the Bertha Foster practice building, and the newly constructed Patricia L. Frost North and South Buildings, home to faculty studios.

== Naming ==
On October 16, 2003, the university announced a $33 million gift from philanthropists Phillip Frost and his wife Patricia and the plan to rename the University of Miami School of Music as Phillip and Patricia Frost School of Music.

== Festival Miami ==
Festival Miami was a music festival series hosted annually by the Frost School of Music in October from 1984 through 2017. In 2017, the festival was integrated with ongoing live music events hosted by the University of Miami throughout the year. Festival Miami offered a range of musical programming, including Latin, jazz, classical, and creative American music. Past performers have included University of Miami alumni Gloria Estefan, Ben Folds, Bruce Hornsby, and Jon Secada. Other past performers have included Joshua Bell, Jackson Browne, Willy Chirino, Shawn Colvin, Edgar Meyer, and others.

== Accreditation ==
The Frost School of Music has been accredited by the National Association of Schools of Music, the principal accrediting body for music schools, since 1939.

== Notable alumni ==
- Michelle Amato, vocalist
- Brian Balmages, composer, conductor, music educator
- Jeffri W. Bantz, music conductor
- Anastasia Barzee, Broadway actress
- Alex Brown, pianist
- Hiram Bullock, guitarist
- Elizabeth Caballero, operatic soprano
- Lewis Cleale, actor
- Sylvia Constantinidis, classical pianist, composer, conductor, music educator
- Ann Curless, pop music vocalist, Exposé
- Kermit Driscoll, jazz bassist
- Mark Egan, jazz bassist, Pat Metheny Group
- Ben Folds, alternative rock musician, vocalist, and songwriter
- Danny Gottlieb, drummer, Pat Metheny Group
- Bruce Hornsby, singer-songwriter and pianist
- Fred Hufsmith, tenor
- Amy Lee, saxophonist, Jimmy Buffett's Coral Reefer Band
- Will Lee, bassist, Late Show with David Letterman
- Dawnn Lewis, actress
- Carmen Lundy, jazz vocalist, composer
- Marvis Martin, operatic soprano
- Joel McNeely, composer
- Sunny Mehta, general manager of the New Jersey Devils
- Johanna Meier, operatic soprano
- Steve Morse, guitarist, Dixie Dregs, Deep Purple
- Erin O'Donnell, vocalist
- Jaelan Phillips, current professional football player, Miami Dolphins
- Robert Phillips, classical guitarist
- Maria Schneider, composer
- Patti Scialfa, vocalist and guitarist, E Street Band, and wife of Bruce Springsteen
- Jon Secada, singer, songwriter
- Matt Serletic, rock music producer, Collective Soul and Matchbox Twenty
- John Splithoff, musician
- Ed Toth, rock music drummer, Vertical Horizon and Doobie Brothers
- James Touchi-Peters, conductor, composer and jazz singer
- Bobby Watson, saxophonist
- Lari White, singer-songwriter
- Andrew Synowiec, prolific LA session musician
- Jorge Mejia, classical pianist, composer, music executive, "'Jorge Mejia receives the 2020 Distinguished Alumnus Award".

== Notable faculty ==
- Shelly Berg, former dean, Frost School of Music, jazz pianist
- Martin Bejerano, jazz piano
- John Bitter, former dean, Frost School of Music, 1950–1963
- Craig Carothers, songwriter, recording artist
- Frank Cooper, musicology
- John Daversa, chair, Frost School of Music Studio Music and Jazz
- Ivan Davis, pianist
- Gary Green, director of bands
- Jim Bob Floyd, piano
- Bertha Foster, former dean, Frost School of Music
- William Franklin Lee III, former dean, Frost School of Music, 1964–1982
- Brian Lynch, jazz trumpet
- Pat Metheny, jazz
- Craig Morris, trumpet
- Jaco Pastorius, jazz
- Bill Porter, audio engineer
- Paul Posnak, piano
- Dafnis Prieto, jazz drummer and percussionist
- Alfred Reed, music business
- Santiago Rodriguez, pianist
- Jo-Michael Scheibe, choral
- Gerard Schwarz, director of orchestral activities
- Thomas Sleeper, former director of orchestral activities, 1993–2018
- Richard Todd, horn
- Paul Wilson, music theorist
- Jorge Mejia, classical pianist, composer, and music executive
