= Bob Weaver (weatherman) =

American television journalist (1928–2006)

- Born: November 20, 1928; New York City
- Died: June 17, 2006 (aged 77); Miami, Florida, United States
- Occupation: weathercaster

Bob Weaver (November 20, 1928 – June 17, 2006) was a broadcast meteorologist in the United States, spending the majority of his career working for television station WTVJ in Miami, Florida.

== Biography ==
Weaver was born in New York City. He moved to Florida to attend the University of Miami. Shortly after graduating in 1949, he was hired by WTVJ, becoming Miami's first TV weatherman alongside anchor/news director Ralph Renick and sportscaster Bernie Rosen. Weaver worked at WTVJ until 1969, then rejoined the station in 1972 after stints at WCBS-TV in New York City and WHDH-TV (channel 5) in Boston. Known as "Weaver the Weatherman", he became a fixture at the station until his retirement in 2003. Weaver anchored coverage of several hurricanes that impacted the region, including Betsy, Cleo, Donna and King, and was praised for having a positive, upbeat on-air demeanor; Weaver also performed ventriloquism during his reports with "Weavie the Weatherbird", a puppet sidekick.

Besides weather, Weaver also read commercials and station identifications, filled in on sports updates, and did other odd jobs at the station.

In 1988, Weaver helped found the Florida Youth Orchestra and served on its board of directors. He also was a supporter of the Children's Cancer Caring Center in Weston, Florida, and various charities in the region.

At the time of his death, Weaver was married to his second wife, Myra, with whom he had two sons, Jason and Shane. He had another son, Robert, from his first marriage as well as two daughters, Syndie and Lisa. He also had 3 grandchildren, Angie, Ryan and Danielle and 2 great-grandchildren, Logan and Calla.

Bob Weaver died of cancer in Miami, Florida, aged 77.
