= Paul Wilson (music theorist) =

Paul Wilson is a music theorist and Professor of Music Theory and Composition at the University of Miami Frost School of Music, in the United States. He holds a B.A. from Harvard College, a M.A. from the University of Hawaiʻi, and M.Phil. and Ph.D. degrees from Yale University, where he studied with Allen Forte.

Paul Wilson is a professor of theory and composition at the University of Miami Frost School of Music where he chairs the committee to design and implement the Frost Experiential Music Curriculum. An expert on Schenkerian theory, he also teaches traditional undergraduate music theory and musicianship, counterpoint, analysis, analysis of 20th-century music, and music-theory pedagogy. He is an internationally recognized expert on Hungarian composer Béla Bartók.

In 1992, Yale University Press published his The Music of Béla Bartók. In this book, Wilson begins by discussing a number of fundamental musical materials that Bartók employed throughout his oeuvre. Using these materials as foundations, he then describes a series of flexible, behaviorally defined harmonic functions and a model of pitch hierarchy based on the functions and on several connective designs. Wilson shows how these hierarchical structures provide meaningful forces for coherence and for dynamism and progressional drive in the music. After analyzing the five works from Bartók's oeuvre, he concludes by explaining the philosophical similarities between his theory and the work of David Lewin and Charles Taylor in the related fields of perception and hermeneutics.

In 2008, he delivered an address on sonata form in Bartók's Fourth Quartet to an international conference on the Bartók Quartets.

Wilson is currently working on studies of the music of Sergei Prokofiev.
