= Jascha Silberstein =

Jascha Silberstein, born Hannes Bruno Willer, (21 April 1934 — 21 November 2008, Hot Springs, Arkansas) was a German-born American musician. He was for thirty years first cellist of the orchestra of the Metropolitan Opera in New York City.

== Early life and education ==
Silberstein was born in Stettin, Germany (today Szczecin, Poland) under the name of Hannes Bruno Willer, and raised in Stettin and then Mannheim. To escape the 1943 bombing raids on Stettin, his family relocated to the maternal home in southern Germany, with his father, a physician, remaining in Stettin. Beginning studies on the piano aged 5, he made his first public appearance at 11, playing Bach's Concerto in D minor, then switched to the cello aged 12 after hearing Gregor Piatigorsky play. After playing for several years with a gypsy band in Wiesbaden and an orchestra in Munich, he studied cello with Rudolf Hindemith, Paul Hindemith's brother, and the legendary Czech violinist Váša Příhoda. He adopted the name Jascha Silberstein in honor of his mentor.

== Career ==
In 1962, leaving the Nuremberg Opera orchestra, he accepted a teaching position at Texas Western College in El Paso, and was also principal cellist in the El Paso Symphony Orchestra during the 1962-63 season. In the 1963-64 season, he played with the Pittsburgh Symphony Orchestra, and in October 1964, joined the Boston Symphony Orchestra. He was released from his contract with the Boston Symphony Orchestra in August 1966, to join the Metropolitan Opera Orchestra as principal cellist, a post he held for thirty years, until his retirement. In the late 1960s and the 1970s, he appeared often at Butler University's Festival of Neglected Romantic Music, playing works that had not been heard in decades, several of which he recorded. He also played at the Newport Music Festival.

== Discography ==
Silberstein recorded albums for London Records and the Musical Heritage Society. A number of his live performances have been issued in a series Jascha Silberstein: Live Performances (1-5).

- 1972 recordings released by London Records. Richard Bonynge conducting L'orchestre de la Suisse Romande.

- Romantic cello concertos (works by Auber, Massenet and Popper)
- Concerto no. 1 in A minor by D. F. E Auber. Orchestrated by Douglas Gamley.
- Concerto in E minor, op. 24 by David Popper.
- Fantasy for cello and orchestra by Jules Massenet.
- Ballet gala : Homage to Pavlova (works by Saint-Saëns, Tchaikovsky, Delibes and others)

- 1975 recordings released by the Musical Heritage Society.

- The Virtuoso sound. With Linda Hall, piano.
- I remember : six poems for cello and piano, by Issachar Miron. With Tsipora Miron, piano.

== Personal life ==
Silberstein died on 21 November 2008 at home in Hot Springs, Arkansas. He was married with two daughters. His obituary was listed in the November 23, 2008 edition of the Arkansas Democrat-Gazette. It did not list a date or cause of death.
