= John Bitter =

John F. Bitter (April 8, 1909 – November 9, 2001) was an American musician, composer, and orchestra conductor who served as the second dean of the School of Music at the University of Miami from 1950 to 1963. He was also music director and conductor of the University of Miami Symphony Orchestra. Guest artists who appeared with the University of Miami Symphony Orchestra under his baton included pianist Artur Rubinstein, cellist Gregor Piatigorsky, and violinist Mischa Elman.

== Early life ==
Born on April 8, 1909, in Manhattan, New York, John Bitter's parents were concert singer Marie A. Schevill and American sculptor Karl Bitter. He first played the violin, then switched to flute and conducting. He had two siblings, physicist Francis T. R. Bitter who helped establish the National Magnet Laboratory at MIT, and professional harpist Marietta C. E. Bitter who was married to actor Walter Abel.

In 1915 his father was struck and killed by a car, after leaving a performance at the Metropolitan Opera in New York.

John Bitter attended Curtis Institute of Music on a music scholarship, where he met composers Samuel Barber and Gian Carlo Menotti and was assistant to conductor Leopold Stokowski. He conducted Barber's Adagio for Strings and Menotti's Amahl and the Night Visitors throughout his career.

In 1934 he married visual artist Dorothy Michelson Dick, daughter of physicist Albert A. Michelson. Dorothy and John Bitter lived in Jacksonville, Florida and raised two daughters, Dorothy Dick (b. 1928) and Ursula Bitter (b. 1936) who graduated with a Bachelor of Music degree from the University of Miami in 1959.

== Music career ==
John Bitter's first professional music appointments were as conductor of the Jacksonville Symphony Orchestra (1934–1937), and conductor of the Florida Federal Symphony (1937–1939). He was also associate conductor of Leopold Stokowski's All American Youth Orchestra (1940–1941).

He subsequently served as conductor of the University of Miami Symphony Orchestra from 1940 to 1942, then enlisted in the US Army during World War II in 1943 and served for five years as an intelligence officer with the Ninth Army. He stayed on after the war in Berlin, and assisted with US cultural re-education efforts as the American Military Government's Information Control Division (ICD)'s supervisor and military license holder for the Berlin Philharmonic. He also conducted the Berlin Philharmonic 30 times between 1945 and 1948, and was guest conductor of the Dresden Symphony Orchestra and the Hamburg Philharmonic.

He divorced, and in 1947 married England-born Barbara Buttery Pinion (1918–2013), a research analyst for the WRAF and a document analyst during the Nuremberg Trials (1945–1946). A daughter Robin Simonetta Bitter was born in Florence, Italy in 1950.

Bitter and his family moved to Miami, Florida, in 1950 when he was named dean of the University of Miami School of Music (renamed Frost School of Music in 2003) and music director and conductor of the University of Miami Symphony Orchestra. A daughter Noel Lesley Bitter was born in Miami in 1952 and a third daughter Marietta Barbara Bitter was born in 1957.

Bitter conducted the University of Miami Symphony Orchestra for 13 seasons with subscribers at both the Miami Beach Municipal Auditorium and the Dade County Auditorium. Concerts featured prominent guest soloists of the day including violinist Yehudi Menuhin, cellist Leonard Rose, soprano Beverly Sills, and pianist Gina Bachauer. He also invited a steady stream of guest conductors including Igor Stravinsky, Heitor Villa-Lobos, Andre Kostelanetz, and Arthur Fiedler. University of Miami music faculty and students performed in the orchestra.

In 1950 he also established a decade-long Miami Beach Summer Pops Concerts series presented by the University of Miami Summer Symphony Orchestra at the Miami Beach Auditorium. Its programming featured guest conductors such as Paul Whiteman and Skitch Henderson, and Bitter conducted concerts featuring soloists such as Cuban pianist Jorge Bolet.

Bitter also guest conducted during the summer months at venues such as the Brevard Music Center in Asheville, North Carolina. In 1959, he conducted the Naumburg Orchestral Concerts, in the Naumburg Bandshell, Central Park, in the summer series.

== Executive career ==
After his retirement from the University of Miami in 1964, Bitter was an executive in the insurance and real estate industries for two decades, and was the honorary Consul for Germany in Miami (1969–1978).

In the 1980s he returned to teaching music as an adjunct professor at Florida International University. He became legally blind in 1989, at age 80.

He died on November 9, 2001, at the age of 92 and is buried at Arlington National Cemetery in Virginia.
