= Sherri Tan =

American figurative artist

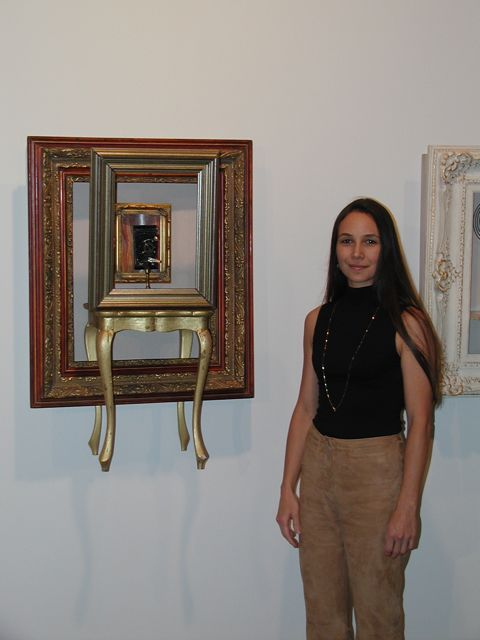
- Sherri Tan during Art Basel Miami
- Born: Sherri Tan; Miami, Florida, U.S.
- Occupation: Artist
- Years active: 1985–present

Sherri Tan is an American figurative artist whose work includes collage, sculpture, photography, books and multimedia. Her work has been exhibited in galleries and museums across the US including the Bass Museum of Art, Miami; the Museum of Art Fort Lauderdale, Ft. Lauderdale; Fotouhi Cramer Gallery, NY; Coral Spring Museum of Art, Brevard Museum, Polk Museum, Society for Contemporary Crafts, Pittsburgh; Center for Contemporary Art, Virginia Beach; and Rosenwald Gallery, University of Pennsylvania. Tan has also been active in designing large-scale sets and artwork for opera and multimedia works including settings for a touring stage production of Gustav Mahler's Das Lied von der Erde presented in the US and China and artworks for composer Thomas Sleeper's operas "Small Change", "River of Shifting Sands" and "The Sisters Antipodes". Larry Budmen of the South Florida Classical Review writes of Tan's sets for a production of Orpheus: "Sherri Tan's striking scenic design mixes painting, photography and sculpture, forming a flexible playing space that spills out into the aisles of the small venue. Contemporary costumes emphasized the timelessness of the tale."

Sherri Tan's work is collected by public, private and corporate collections including the Patrick and Beatrice Haggerty Museum of Art, Milwaukee, Arthur and Mata Jaffe Collection, the Ruth and Marvin Sackner Archive of Visual and Concrete Poetry and the Miami-Dade County Public Library Collection. She has received various awards including the National Foundation for Advancement in the Arts' three-year CAVA fellowship, the Florida Division of Cultural Affairs Individual Artist grant and three Artist Access grants from Tigertail Productions. In 2001, Tan received a grant award for writing an original story and opera libretto, River of Shifting Sands, which premiered in Portland, Oregon. Tan is also a professional paintings conservator. Sherri Tan earned an M.F.A. degree from the University of Miami in 1996 and a B.A. degree for multi-media art from the Union Institute, Cincinnati, Ohio in 1987.

Most recently, Tan's works were featured in a 20-year survey at the Bridge Red Studios in Miami.

== Recent Sculpture ==
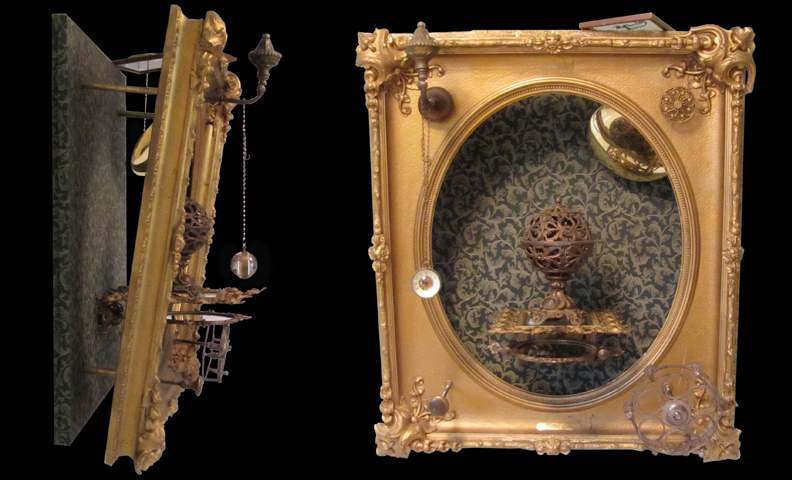
"Untitled (B.West)", 37 x 32 x 17 1/2 inches, Found objects including frames, mirrors, clocks, chains, fabric, butterflies, 2011

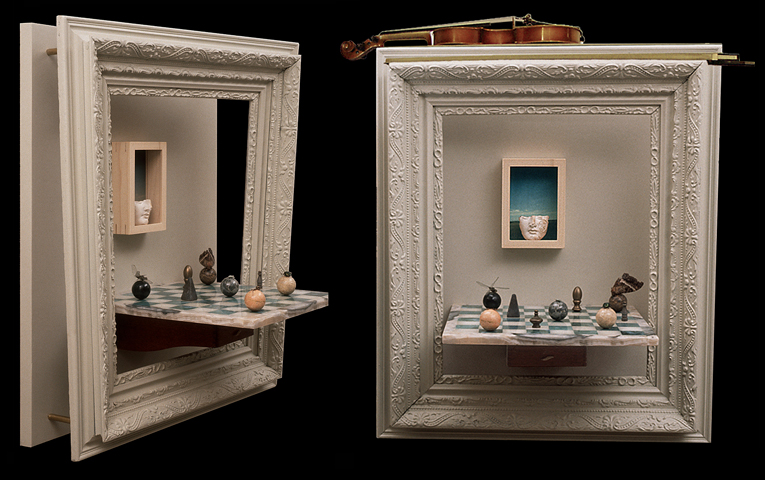
"Echo Fugue", 33 1/2 x 27 x 15 1/2 inches, Found objects including frame, marble, brass, insects, photograph, wax, music box, 2003

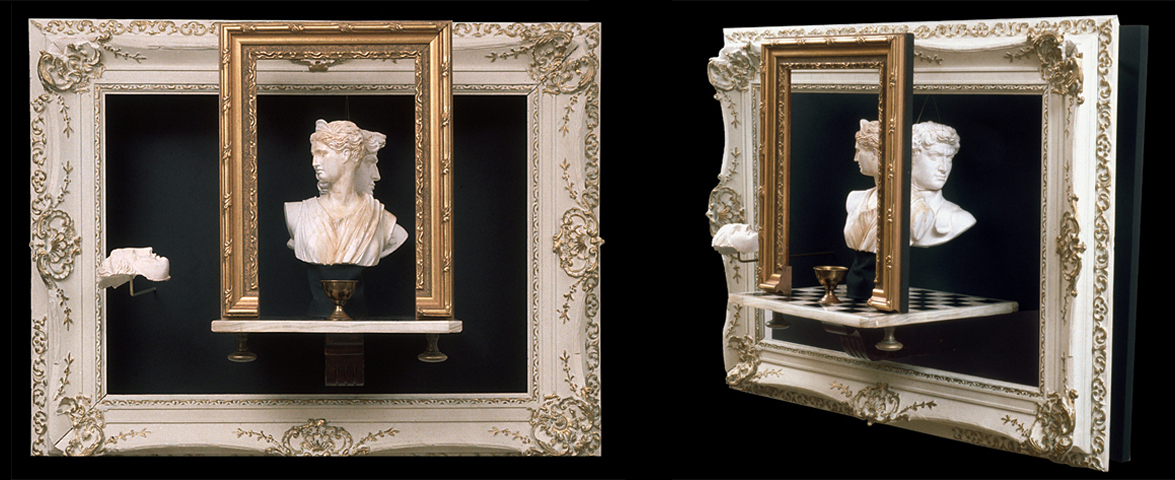
"The Janus", 29 x 37 x 16 inches, Found objects including frames, marble, plaster, wax, cloth, brass, 2001

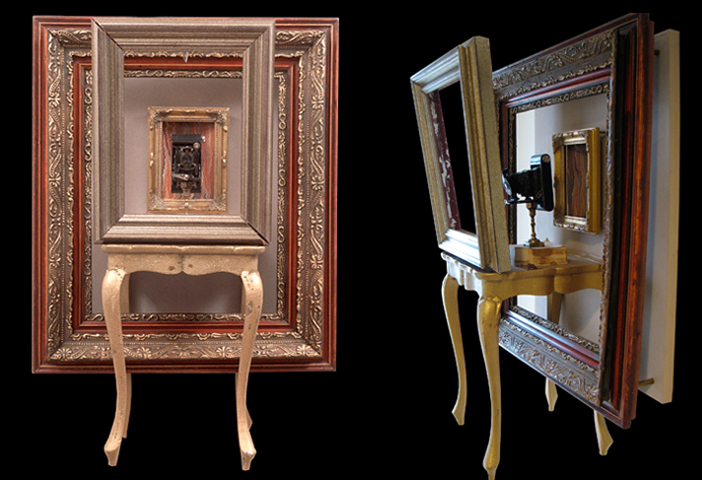
"Daguerreotype", 38 x 25 1/2 x 17 1/2 inches, Found objects including frames, table, book, camera, chain, insect, 2000

== Early Sculpture ==
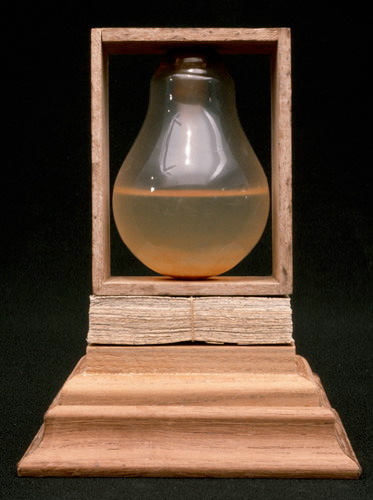
"Light Bulb and Paper": paper, wood, bulb, twine. 61/4 x 4 3/4 x 3 3/8 inches. 1996.

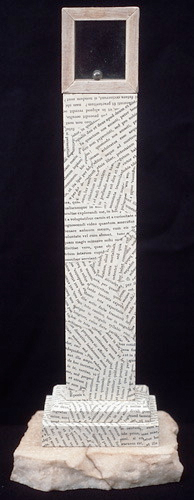
"Monument": paper collage, marble, wood, plexiglass, found object. 15 x 5 1/2 x 4 inches. 1992.

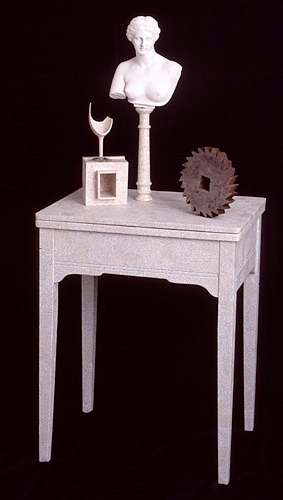
"Inevitability of Longing": paper collage, plaster, wood, glass. 53 x 23 1/4 x 12 inches. 1994.

== Photography ==
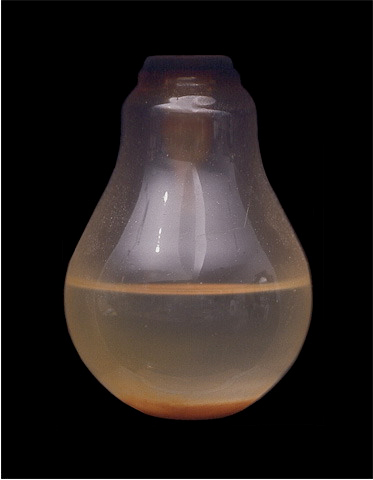
"Liquid Beauty": 48 X 38 inches, 2002

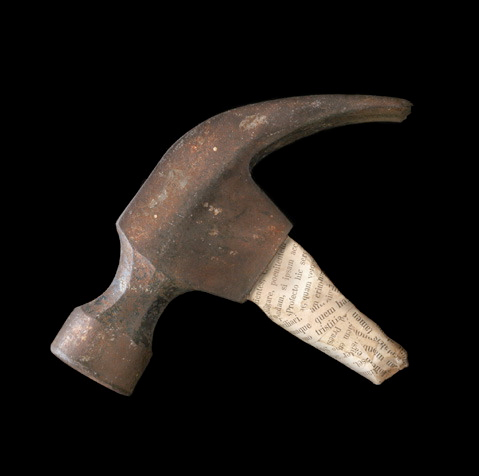
"Hammer": 40 X 40 inches, 2001

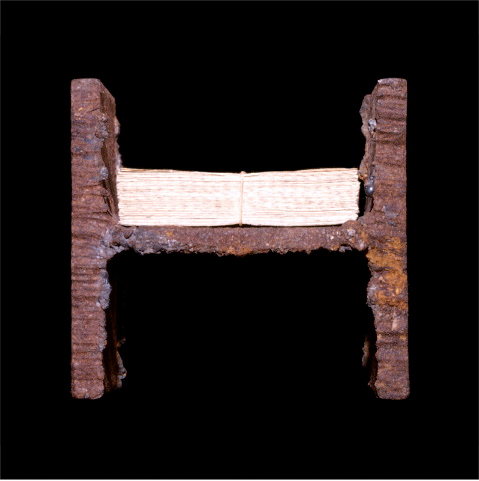
"I Beam": 40 X 40 inches, 2001

== Books ==
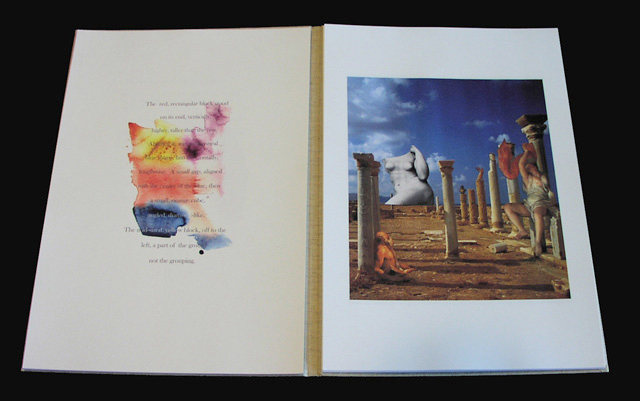
"Kings Queens Knights Pawns", 19 x 13 x 1 inches, Book View: A portfolio of twenty original Giclée prints, prose poems and watercolors, 19 x 13 x 1 inches, limited edition of 25

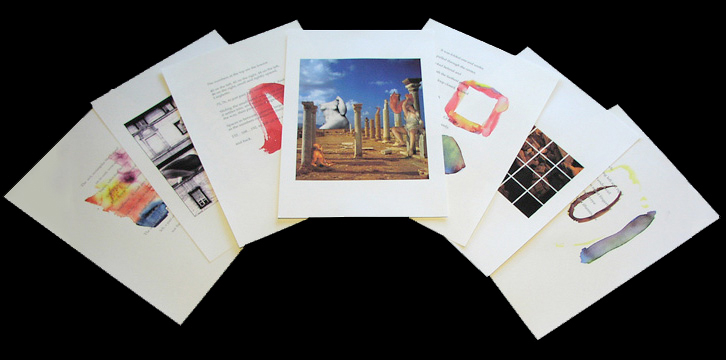
"Kings Queens Knights Pawns", 19 x 13 x 1 inches, Portfolio View: A portfolio of twenty original Giclée prints, prose poems and watercolors, 19 x 13 x 1 inches, limited edition of 25

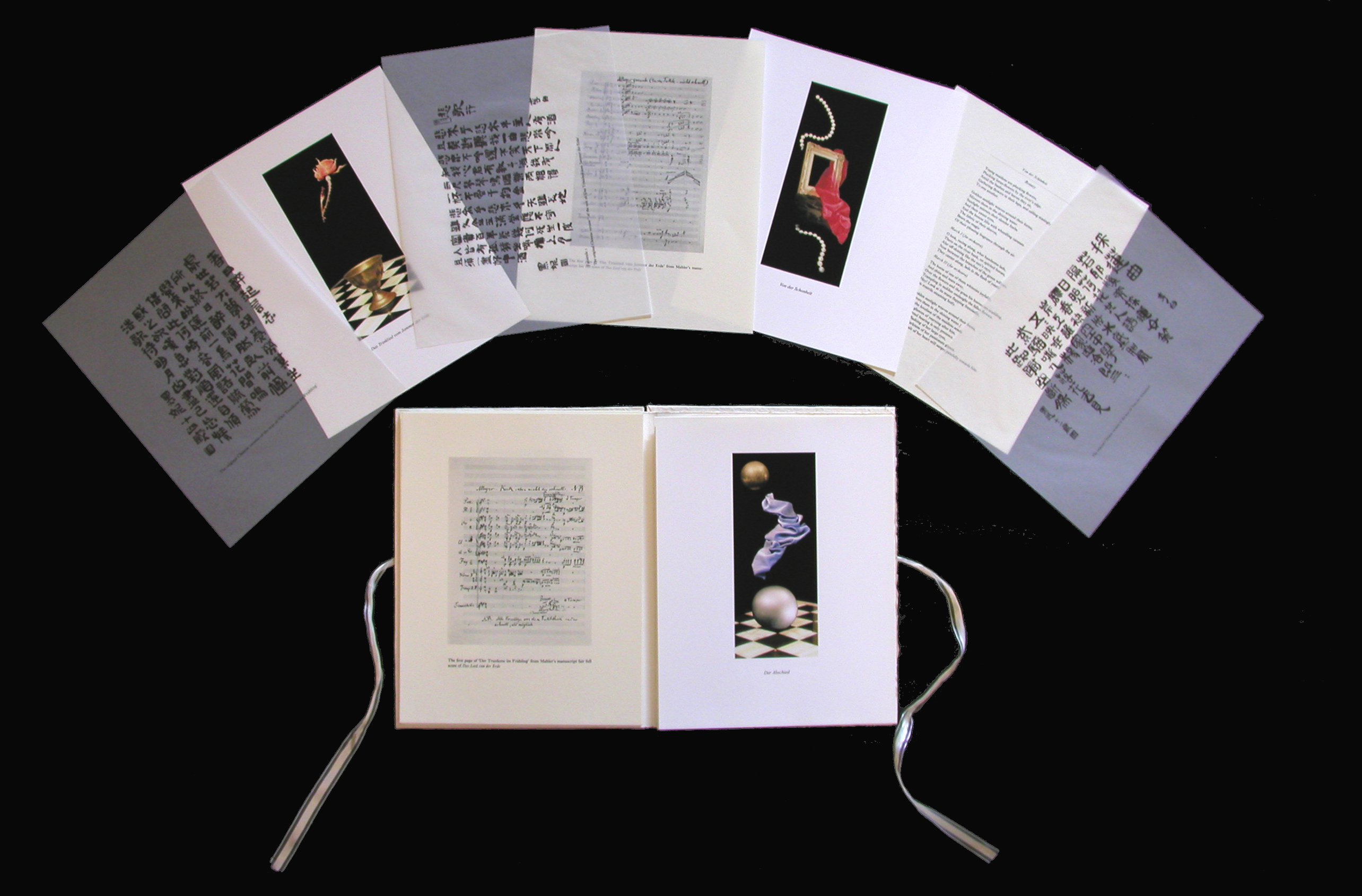
"Das Lied von der Erde", 2002, Book of 28 Giclée prints on 11 X 8 ½ inch, archival papers. Handmade book covers, limited edition of 5
