= James William Hipp =

American music educator and administrator

J. William "Bill" Hipp (born May 2, 1934) is an American music educator and administrator. He served as the fourth dean of the Frost School of Music at the University of Miami from 1983 to 2007. He served as the president of the National Association of Schools of Music from 1998 to 2000 and was inducted into the Florida Music Education Association Hall of Fame in 2002.

== Early years ==
Hipp was born in Guntersville, Alabama.

A trumpet player, he earned a bachelor’s, master’s, and doctoral degree in music education from University of Texas at Austin, where he later became a teaching assistant and administrative assistant to the dean of the College of Fine Arts.

== Career ==
Hipp taught for four years as a junior high and high school band director in Corpus Christi, Texas. In 1964 he joined the music faculty of Del Mar College where he taught brass instruments for nine years. In 1973, he was hired as director of the School of Music at Illinois Wesleyan University and taught there until 1976.

He served for seven years as chairman of the division of music at the Meadows School of the Arts at Southern Methodist University from 1976 to 1983.

During these years he played principal trumpet with the Bloomington-Normal Symphony Orchestra, the Austin Orchestra, Corpus Christi Symphony and the Dallas Civic Symphony.

He was a member of the board of trustees for the Dallas Symphony Association, and a member of the board of trustees for the Dallas Youth Orchestra.

In June 1983 he was hired as dean of the School of Music at the University of Miami and served in that capacity for 24 years until his own retirement in May 2007. Soon after his arrival, Hipp streamlined the School into eight departments.

He launched community engagement programs, including an International Festival of the Arts in 1984, renamed Festival Miami; the University of Miami Salzburg Opera Program, a study abroad program for collegiate level opera singers; UM Music Time, an early childhood education program; plus Honor Band and Honor Choir programs.

He raised more than $100 million to support the school’s programs and facilities, including a $33 million gift in 2003 from Miami-based philanthropists Dr. Phillip Frost and Patricia Frost. This was the largest gift to date to a university-based music school in the United States.

Hipp secured funding for the Marta and Austin Weeks Music Library and Technology Center and the L. Austin Weeks Center for Recording and Performance and increased scholarship funding.

Following his retirement in 2007, he served as interim dean of the Conservatory of Music at University of the Pacific (2007–09), interim director of the School of Music at the University of South Florida (2010–11), and interim director of the School of Music at Florida International University (Fall 2014).

== Awards ==
- Florida Music Educators Association Hall of Fame Laureate (2002).
- Cavaliere by the Republic of Italy
- Amicus Poloniae Award by the Republic of Poland (2004)
- Diploma de Honor by the Organization of American States
- "Arts Hero" Award by the Arts and Business Council of Miami (2006)
- "Inside Out" Award by the UM Alumni Association (2006)
- Distinguished Service Award by the UM Citizens Board (2006)
- March 18, 2007 was declared "William Hipp Day" in proclamations issued by Miami-Dade County, the City of Coral Gables and the Florida House of Representatives.

== Publications ==
- A critical analysis and comparison of seven complete trumpet-cornet methods, by James William Hipp, (University of Texas Austin, 1963) M.A. thesis/dissertation, book.
- Practices in the evaluation of music faculty in higher education, by James William Hipp (University of Texas Austin, 1981), D.M.A. dissertation, book.
- Evaluating music faculty, by William Hipp, (Princeton, N.J.: Prestige Publications, 1983), book.
- Musical chairs: a management handbook for music executives in higher education, by Frederick Miller, Robert J. Werner, James William Hipp (Missoula, Mont.: College Music Society, 2006), e-book.
- University of Miami School of Music: celebrating 75 years of musical and academic excellence, by George N. Heller, James William Hipp, Nicholas DeCarbo, Kenneth J. Moses (Frost School of Music, 2001).
