= Florida Youth Orchestra =

Philharmonic orchestra

The Florida Youth Orchestra is a philharmonic orchestra for young musicians, ages 6 – 19. It was founded in 1988 by South Florida's first TV weatherman Bob Weaver. The orchestra has more than 400 members. Under the direction and guidance of its music director Thomas Sleeper, the FYO performs for thousands of concert-goers each year in addition to regular appearances on local and national television and radio broadcasts.
