= Paul Posnak =

American pianist and music academic

Paul Posnak is an American pianist and music academic. He is noted for playing repertoires mixing twentieth-century American music with European romantic classics, ranging from George Gershwin to Frédéric Chopin, from classical to jazz. His transcriptions and performances of the original improvisations of Gershwin, Fats Waller and Jelly Roll Morton have gained him international attention.

Posnak is Professor of Keyboard Performance, and Director of the Accompanying/Chamber Music Program at the University of Miami's Frost School of Music. His parallel international career as a concert pianist began with a scholarship to the Juilliard Preparatory School of Music at the age of eight. He earned Bachelors, Masters, and Doctoral degrees at Juilliard. He won the Loeb Prize, and First Prizes in the International J.S. Bach Competition and the Concert Artists Guild Competition. He has performed at the White House, the US Supreme Court, and the Kennedy Center in Washington, D.C.; at Carnegie Hall and Alice Tully Halls in New York City; and throughout Europe, South America, and Asia. He has worked with many world-renowned vocalists, including Luciano Pavarotti and Jennie Tourel, and has performed and recorded with many of the world's leading chamber ensembles. His recordings include solo and chamber works for labels such as EMI, Naxos, Vox, and Arabesque. He was the featured pianist in a biographical documentary on Chopin (1999), directed by documentary film maker Anthony Allegro. He is artist-in-residence, leading master-classes at the Musique-Cordiale festival in France and has been associated for many years with other festivals in Germany and at Salzburg, Austria.

Posnak is known for his own improvisations and note-for-note transcriptions of the great American jazz pianist-composers of the 1920s and 1930s. He transcribed the original solo improvisations of George Gershwin and Thomas "Fats" Waller from the old recordings and radio broadcasts. His transcriptions of 16 of Waller's greatest solos have been published by Hal Leonard. He is also notable for his understanding of the importance which Chopin placed upon tempo rubato, especially (for example) as exemplified in his rendition of the Study in Ab Major.
