= Charles Agnew =

- Also known as: Charlie Agnew
- Born: June 22, 1901
- Died: 25 October 1978 (aged 77)
- Genre: dance band

Charles Agnew (June 22, 1901 – October 25, 1978) was a popular dance-band leader. Most popular in the 1930s as a midwestern territory band appearing in a sequence of hotel ballrooms, he enjoyed a long career that extended into the 1960s.

== Biography ==
Agnew was raised in New Jersey. Agnew's band was primarily based in the Chicago area, where he was often engaged at the Aragon Ballroom, the Edgewater Hotel (with Irene Taylor on vocals) and the Stephens Hotel. With co-composers Charles Newman and Audree Collins, he wrote a song called "Slow but Steady" which was copyright in 1931. He appeared, alongside the Paul Whiteman and Gus Edwards orchestras, at the "Marathon Opera" which benefitted the Chicago Herald and Examiner Milk Fund. Through the 1930s his orchestra was heard nationally in the United States on the NBC Radio network. On July 25, 1933, he recorded several songs for Columbia Records, the most popular of which was "Don't Blame Me." The New Yorker magazine reviewed this recording as "richly played." Represented by the Musical Corporation of America, he spent the summer of 1936 playing at the Colonial Hotel in Indiana, where featured vocalists were Lon Saxon and Emrie Ann Lincoln. He continued to lead his dance band into the 1940s. During World War II he actively toured the country, playing for the benefit of enlisted personnel and continuing his hotel engagements. While many big band leaders disbanded, Agnew kept his unit together until the late 1950s. At that point he downsized to a smaller group, until retiring about 1968.

Agnew could play many different instruments, from disparate classifications. He was receiving treatment for cancer when he died on October 25, 1978, in Waukegan, Illinois.

=== Discography ===
Title	Recording Date	Vocalist	Issue	Notes
Don't Blame Me	July 25, 1933	Stanley Jacobsen	Columbia 2793-D	
My Last Year's Girl	July 25, 1933	Dusty Roades	Columbia 2797-D	
To Be or Not To Be In Love	July 25, 1933	Dusty Roades	Columbia 2797-D	
Trouble in Paradise	July 25, 1933	Stanley Jacobsen	Columbia 2793-D	
