= Festival of Neglected Romantic Music =

Classical music festival in Indianapolis, Indiana, United States

The Festival of Neglected Romantic Music was founded by musicologist Frank Cooper at Butler University in Indianapolis, Indiana in 1968.

== History ==
Cooper directed the Festival for the next eleven years, during which time many seminal works of the Romantic era that had not been heard since the 19th century received their first modern performances, including:

- orchestral works by Bruneau, David, Duparc, Goedicke, Guiraud, Hofmann, Martucci, Raff, Anton Rubinstein, Schelling, Sinding, and Spohr;
- concertos by Boëllmann, Bronsart, Dreyschock, Ernst, Godard, Goltermann, Henselt, Herz, Hummel, Joachim, Moszkowski, Palmgren, Rheinberger, Rimsky-Korsakov and Anton Rubinstein;
- choral works by Gade, Pierne, Raff, Reger, Sgambati and Weber,
- fully staged ballets by Burgmüller, Drigo, Glazunov, Hertel, Offenbach and Thomas,
- solo and chamber works by Alkan, Blumenfeld, Bronsart, Dohnanyi, Godowsky, Nápravník, Xaver Scharwenka, and Thalberg.

Certain specific performers became associated with the Festival, including violinist Aaron Rosand, pianists Jorge Bolet, Malcolm Frager, Gunnar Johansen and Raymond Lewenthal, cellists James Kreger and Jascha Silberstein, and conductors Victor Borge, Igor Buketoff, Jorge Mester and Izler Solomon – many of whom went on to record several of these works for commercial record labels. Schonberg wrote many articles crediting Cooper with almost single-handedly jumpstarting the Romantic Revival in music. The Festival continued after Cooper left.

== Reviews ==
The New York Times' music critic Harold C. Schonberg and other critics commented on the high professional level of the presentations.
