= Jeffri W. Bantz =

Background information
- Born: April 5, 1954; Marion, Indiana, U.S.
- Died: July 31, 2006 (aged 52) Fort Lauderdale, Florida, U.S.
- Occupations: Musician, Choir Director
- Instruments: Voice, Organ, Piano, Harpsichord

Jeffri W. Bantz (April 5, 1954 – July 31, 2006) was an American classical conductor and teacher.

== Early life ==
A native of Marion, Indiana, Bantz moved with his family to Florida in 1969 when his father, the Rev. Wayne Bantz started First Methodist Church of Coral Springs, Florida. He attended Pompano Beach High School and graduated from Deerfield Beach High School, where he was concertmaster of the school orchestra.

== Musical training ==
Bantz received his formal music education at Florida Atlantic University and the University of Miami, where he studied organ performance. Throughout his conducting career, he continued his studies with many choral conductors including Robert Shaw, George Bragg, Joseph Flummerfelt, Sir David Willcocks, John Rutter, Howard Swan, Gerre Hancock and James Litton.

== Church career ==
His first church job in Florida was at the First Baptist Church in Deerfield Beach, Florida. He served several churches, including First Methodist Church of Pompano Beach, Florida and St. Stephens Episcopal in Coconut Grove, Florida. In 1981, he became the organist and associate director of music at the First Presbyterian Church of Pompano Beach (known as the Pink Church), where he had begun organ study with Dr. Arden Whitacre some eleven years prior. In 1998, he became director of music at the Pink Church, where he remained until June 2006. Under his direction the music program at the Pink Church became widely respected throughout the country.

== Florida Philharmonic and Master Chorale of South Florida ==
In 2000, Bantz joined the Florida Philharmonic Chorus as assistant director. When the orchestra folded three years later, he and Dr. Jo-Michael Scheibe led the chorus in its new form as the Master Chorale of South Florida, whose performances have received high critical acclaim.

== Florida's Singing Sons Boychoir ==
Bantz was associated with the Florida's Singing Sons Boychoir for 20 years. During his 17-year tenure as music director, he molded the choir into a world-class performing group which won numerous awards including four international First Prizes during their many concert tours around the world. They included the 1996 Kathaumixw International Choral Festival and Competition in British Columbia, the 1997 Prague International Choir Festival in the Czech Republic, and the 1998 Princeton Invitational Choir Competition. The Singing Sons performed the National Anthem at the very first Florida Marlins baseball game in 1993. Under Bantz' direction, the boychoir was featured in performances with James Judd, Maureen Forester, Chanticleer, Audrey Hepburn, Liza Minnelli, Judy Collins, the Bee Gees (with whom they recorded a CD) and many others. They also were featured performers at national and regional conventions of the American Choral Directors Association.

== Other musical accomplishments ==
Equally in demand as a solo performer or accompanist, Bantz performed in South Florida with the University of Miami Symphony, the Palm Beach Opera, the Miami Beach Symphony, the Florida Philharmonic Orchestra, the Ft. Lauderdale Symphony Chorus, the Gold Coast Opera, the Ft. Lauderdale Christian Chorale and the Nova Singers. He also served as conductor or accompanist for numerous international artists such as Marvis Martin, Dean Peterson, Janice Chandler, Steven Rickards, Curtis Rayam and many others.

== Awards ==
The recipient of numerous local, state, and national awards, Bantz was awarded the Joseph Leavitt Award for outstanding achievement in the arts in 1993. In 1995, he was a finalist for the Cultural Foundation of Broward County's Moretti Award. In 2005, he received the Distinguished Service Award from the Broward County Music Teachers Association.
