= Yehuda Hanani =

Israeli-American cellist

Yehuda Hanani (Hebrew: יהודה הנני) is an international soloist, recording artist, Israeli-American cellist and Professor of Violoncello at the University of Cincinnati College-Conservatory of Music.

== Biography ==
Hanani studied with Leonard Rose at Juilliard and with Pablo Casals. He has performed with orchestras such as the Chicago Symphony, Philadelphia Orchestra, Baltimore Symphony, Saint Paul Chamber Orchestra, Israel Philharmonic, BBC Welsh Symphony, Irish National Symphony, Buenos Aires Philharmonic, Berlin Radio Symphony Orchestra, Jerusalem Symphony, Belgrade Philharmonic, Honolulu Symphony, Seoul Symphony, and I Solisti Zagreb (conducting from the cello) among many others. In New York City, he has performed at Carnegie Hall, the 92nd Street Y, Alice Tully, and the Metropolitan Museum of Art. He is a frequent guest at major music festivals (Aspen, Bowdoin, Chautauqua, Yale at Norfolk, Blue Hill, Great Wall in Beijing, Great Lakes, Round Top, Casals Prades in France, Finland Festival, Ottawa, Oslo, Prague, and Australia Chamber Music), and has collaborated in performances with preeminent fellow musicians. Highly regarded as a teacher who has inspired a generation of young cellists with his consummate musicianship and originality, he also served on the faculty of the Peabody Conservatory and presents master classes around the globe (Juilliard, Paris Conservatoire, Hochschule fur Musik and Hanns Eisler Hoschschule in Berlin, Hochschule fur Musik Cologne, Royal Academy of Music and Guildhall in London, Royal Welsh Academy of Music and Drama, Tokyo National University, Taiwan National College of Arts, Utrecht Conservatory, University of Indiana at Bloomington, McGill University, Jerusalem Academy of Music, University of Mexico City, University of Texas at Houston, Bard, Arizona State University, and many more. In 2008 through 2010 he had residencies at the Shanghai, Beijing and Tianjin Central Conservatories in China.

He is especially sought after as an interpreter and elucidator of the music of Johann Sebastian Bach, and his recording of the six suites (Townhall Records) has been critically hailed for its personal relationship with the score. From 1995-2007 he directed the International Bach"Annalia" Festival at the University of Cincinnati. He was the first cellist in the West to record the sonatas of Nikolai Miaskovsky (Finnadar) and won a Grand Prix du Disque nomination for his pioneering recording of the Alkan Sonate de concert in E major. He has similarly championed composers such as Leo Ornstein, Virgil Thomson, and William Schuman with performances and recordings of their works and has been credited with helping to rediscover the life and works of Mendelssohn student Eduard Franck, whose chamber music he has recorded (NAXOS) with violinist Shmuel Ashkenasi and pianist James Tocco. He has also been at the forefront of thematic programming and has directed the innovative chamber music series Close Encounters With Music, based in the Berkshires, since 1990 in cities across the U.S. and Canada, including Miami, Ft. Lauderdale, Scottsdale, Omaha, Calgary, and at the Frick Museum in New York City. Major composers who have written works for him include: Lera Auerbach, Robert Beaser, Kenji Bunch, Osvaldo Golijov, Jonathan Keren, Owen Leech, Jorge Martin, John Musto, William Perry, Bernard Rands, and Paul Schoenfield. He is a frequent recital partner of pianist Michele Levin.

Yehuda Hanani has been the subject of hundreds of feature stories, interviews, and reviews in the national and international press, including The New York Times, London Daily Telegraph, Chicago Tribune, Miami Herald, Detroit Free Press, Los Angeles Times, Boston Globe, Baltimore Sun, Washington Post, Philadelphia Inquirer, Cincinnati Enquirer, Arizona Republic, Buffalo Evening News, St. Louis Post-Dispatch, American Record Guide, Stereo Review, Musical America, Strings, Strad, Fanfare, newspapers throughout Europe, Israel, Central and South America, and has been a contributor to Chamber Music Magazine, Strings, and Strad. He has presented over 200 original lectures on music and culture, including appearances at museums: Metropolitan Museum of Art, Detroit Museum of Art, Phoenix Art Museum, Norman Rockwell Museum, Berkshire Museum, Frick Collection, and the Joslyn Art Museum. Aimed at outreach for classical music, his weekly program on NPR affiliate station WAMC Northeast Radio, "Classical Music According to Yehuda," has gained thousands of fans for the direct broadcast and podcast. An addition to his educational mission is the founding in 2010 of the Catskill High Peaks Festival in Hunter, NY.

Born in Jerusalem, Hanani was brought to the United States from Israel by Leonard Bernstein and Isaac Stern at the age of 19. Bernstein was in the country to guest conduct with the Israel Philharmonic and heard Hanani perform. He currently serves on the faculty of the Mannes School in New York City.

== Discography ==
=== J.S. Bach — Six Suites for Cello Solo ===
- Suite No. 1 in G major
- Suite No. 4 in E flat major
- Suite No. 5 in C minor
- Suite No. 3 in C major
- Suite No. 2 in D minor
- Suite No. 6 in D major

=== Dazzle and Nostalgia: Cello Favorites ===
(with Michele Levin, piano)

- "Song Without Words", Op. 109 — Mendelssohn
- "Serenade" — Schubert
- "Rondo" — Weber
- "Suite Populaire Espagnole" — de Falla
- "Vocalise" — Rachmaninoff
- "Nocturne", Op. 19, No. 4 — Tchaikovsky
- "Valse Sentimentale", Op. 51, No. 6 — Tchaikovsky
- "Sicilienne", Op. 78 — Fauré
- "The Swan" — Saint-Saëns
- "Variations on a Theme from Rossini's Moses" — Paganini
- "Liebesleid" — Kreisler
- "Schön Rosmarin" — Kreisler
- "Czardas — Monti

=== Schubert/Schumann for Cello and Piano ===
(with Michele Levin, piano)

- "Sonata in A Minor", D. 821 "Arpeggione" — Franz Schubert
- "Sonatina in D Major", Op. 137, No. 1, D. 384 — Schubert
- "Stücke im Volkston in A Minor", Op. 102 — Robert Schumann
- "Fantasie Stücke" — Schumann

=== Vivaldi — Six Sonatas for Cello, Harpsichord, and Continuo ===
(with Lionel Party, Harpsichord; and Miho Zaitsu, Continuo)

- Sonata No. 1 in B flat major
- Sonata No. 2 in F major
- Sonata No. 3 in A minor
- Sonata No. 4 in B flat minor
- Sonata No. 5 in E minor
- Sonata No. 6 in B flat major

== See also ==
- Albany Records
