= Santiago Rodriguez (pianist) =

- Born: February 16, 1952 (age 74); Cardenas, Cuba
- Genres: Classical music
- Occupations: Concert pianist and piano pedagogue
- Label: Élan Recordings
- Website: https://elanrecordings.com/santiago-rodriguez/

Santiago Rodriguez (born February 16, 1952) is a Cuban-American pianist. Rodriguez is an exclusive recording artist for Élan Recordings. His Rachmaninov recordings received the Rosette award in The Penguin Guide to Recorded Classical Music and he is a silver medalist in the Van Cliburn International Piano Competition.

== Background ==
Rodriguez was born in Cárdenas, Cuba, and began piano studies at age four with Nelson DeBerge. When Rodriguez was eight years old, he and his brother became part of Project Peter Pan, a project sponsored by Catholic Charities which brought Cuban children to America during Fidel Castro’s regime. Although his parents originally thought that they would be quickly reunited, it took six years for the parents to immigrate to America. He continued his piano lessons while living in the orphanage in New Orleans supported by money that his mother had sewn in his coat. When he was ten years old, Rodriguez debuted with the New Orleans Symphony Orchestra performing Mozart's Piano Concerto No. 27. He entered Holy Cross School in eighth grade. Frank Mannino was Director of the Music Department. Richard Crosby was Director of the Glee Club. The Stage Band won first place at the Louisiana Tech Stage Band Festival. Santiago was named an all star. He graduated with the Holy Cross High School Class of 1969. Anthony Laciura and Dennis Assaf were classmates. Rodriquez completed his Bachelor of Music degree with William Race at the University of Texas and the Master of Music degree with Adele Marcus at the Juilliard School. After winning the silver medal at the Van Cliburn International Piano Competition in 1981, Rodriguez launched his international career. He has been featured on the ABC, NBC, PBS, CNN, BBC, CBC television networks.

== Concert career ==
Highlights of Rodriguez's concert career include performances at venues such as Carnegie Hall, Schauspielhaus in Berlin, Leipzig’s Gewandhaus, Queen Elizabeth Hall in London, Montreal's Théâtre Maisonneuve, Alice Tully Hall in New York, The John F. Kennedy Center for the Performing Arts in Washington, D.C., and the Herbst Theatre in San Francisco. He has performed internationally with orchestras, including the London Symphony Orchestra, the Staatskapelle Dresden, the Staatskapelle Weimar, the Yomiuri Nippon Symphony Orchestra of Japan, the Tampere Philharmonic of Finland, the Berliner Symphoniker, the Philadelphia, Chicago, St. Louis, Baltimore, Seattle, Indianapolis, American Composers, as well as the Houston Symphony Orchestras, the National Symphony Orchestra of Washington, D.C., and the American Symphony Orchestra at Avery Fisher Hall in New York. Festivals include the Santander Festival in Spain and the Ravenna Festival in Italy.

As a chamber musician, Rodriguez has performed with the Guarneri Quartet, Chamber Music Society of Lincoln Center, Ruggiero Ricci, Nathaniel Rosen, Walter Trampler, Ransom Wilson, Gervaise de Peyer, Aurora Nátola-Ginastera, and Robert McDuffie.

== Recordings ==
Rodriguez records exclusively for Élan Recordings, a record company which he and his wife, Natalia Rodriguez, founded in 1985. He has recorded for the label works by Rachmaninov, as well as some of the Spanish composers in which he specializes. Other recordings he has made include works by Bach, Brahms, Ginastera, Liszt, Tchaikovsky, and Grieg.

=== Selected discography ===
- Rachmaninov, Volume I (Piano Sonata No. 1, Preludes, Op. 32) 1993. Élan Recordings.
- Rachmaninov, Volume II (Piano Sonata No. 2, Chopin Variations, Morceaux de fantaisie) 1994. Élan Recordings.
- Rachmaninov, Volume III (Preludes Op. 23, Corelli Variations, Nocturnes, Songs Without Words) 1995. Élan Recordings.
- Santiago Rodriguez plays Rachmaninov (Includes live performance of Rachmaninov 3rd Concerto with Lake Forest Symphony) 1999. Élan Recordings.
- Rachmaninov 3rd/Prokofiev 3rd (Sofia Philharmonic) 1997. Élan Recordings.
- Rachmaninov 2nd/Chopin 2nd (Berliner Symphoniker Orchestra) 1997. Élan Recordings.
- Ginastera Variaciones Concertantes (Richmond Sinfonia) 1996. Élan Recordings.
- Santiago Rodriguez Plays Ginastera (also works by Albeniz, Falla, Granados, and Ruvo) 1998 Élan Recordings.
- Spanish Album (music by Manuel de Falla, Antonio Soler, Joaquin Turina, and Ernesto Lecuona) 1994. Élan Recordings.
- Brahms (Paganini Variations, 16 Waltzes, Chaconne by Bach) 1997. Élan Recordings.
- Tchaikovsky, Grieg and Liszt Piano Concertos (Sofia Philharmonic) 1996. Élan Recordings.
- Piano in Hollywood: the Classic Movie Concertos (Fairfax Symphony Orchestra) 1995. Élan Recordings.
- Max Reger: "Mozart Variations for Two Pianos: Bach-Reger: Brandenbug Concertos (Peter Rosel and Santiago Rodriguez). Élan Recordings.

== Critical reception ==
After performances, he has been called a "phenomenal pianist" by The New York Times and "one of the finest pianists in the world" by The Baltimore Sun. The Washington Post review included "Santiago Rodriguez is one of the finest pianists on the international scene. In an age in which classicism is revered, this Cuban-born pianist remains a fervent Romantic, spellbinding the audience with his warmth and Promethean fire." After a 2010 concert for the Festival Miami, his review included: "Rodriguez is a pianist of impeccable technique and refined artistic sensibilities. Every note is perfectly placed, his precision and attention to detail everywhere apparent." Santiago’s Rachmaninov recordings have consistently received rave reviews. In reviewing volume one of the Rachmaninov Series, The Penguin Guide to Recorded Classical Music 2010 stated "...This is some Rachmaninov playing! Santiago Rodriguez is the real thing. For a moment, one imagines that Rachmaninov himself is at the keyboard. Rodriguez has something of Pletnev about him: wonderful authority and immaculate technical control, tremendous electricity as well as great poetic feeling. Outstanding in every way." In reviewing volume one and two of Rachmaninov, Bryce Morrison of Gramophone includes "Santiago Rodriguez, the Cuban-American virtuoso, is born for Rachmaninov, and I doubt whether any of the works on these two discs have often been played with such a spellbinding mix of high-born virtuosity and poetic glamour." In reviewing Rachmaninov 3rd/Prokofiev 3rd, the American Record Guide includes, "This brilliant American virtuoso takes charge immediately and steers his way through the entire concerto with blazing conviction, tremendous technical strength, unswerving concentration and galvanic excitement – but always under absolute control. Among current CDs of the Rachmaninov Third, this goes immediately to the top of the list. I’m familiar with over 60 commercially-issued recordings of the work, and I have no hesitation in placing Rodriguez/Tabakov in the top five." Dixon of Musical America reviewed it as "...The most positively macho, dramatic, and emotionally riveting performance within long memory. At last, we have among us a true artist quite unafraid of being a dramatic virtuoso, the greatest since Kapell." Rodriiguez’ Ginastera cd was reviewed in New York Magazine as "Ginastera’s brilliantly incisive music might have been written for the special talents of this pianist. The lyrical and percussive extremes of the composer’s distinctive style fully exploit Rodriguez’ remarkable combination of introspective, poetic delicacy and explosive virtuosity."

== Teaching career ==
Rodriguez is active as a pedagogue and masterclass clinician. In 1977, Rodriguez began his teaching career at University of Missouri in Columbia, Missouri. In 1980, he joined the University of Maryland, College Park as Artist-in-Residence and Professor of Piano. He remained there until fall 2009, when he moved to Frost School of Music at the University of Miami as Chair of the Keyboard Department, Professor of Piano and Artist-in-Residence. Rodriguez is also active as a judge for major piano competitions. Most recently, he was Chair of the Jury at the William Kapell International Piano Competition and the San Antonio International Piano Competition.

== See also ==
- Music of Cuba
- List of Cuban Americans

== Sources ==
- Alfanos, V. "On the Go with Santiago Rodriguez." Fanfare, 1986, Vol. 10 Issue n. 6, pp. 326-333.
- Ashby. "Guide to Records: Santiago Rodriguez." American Record Guide, Jul/Aug 1994, Vol. 57 Issue n. 4, pg. 155.
- Brown, Steven. "Two Concerts Offered Music Lovers Passion, Charm." Orlando Sentinel, Jan. 9, 1996.
- Budmen, Lawrence. "Santiago Rodriguez's Memorable Recital worth waiting for." South Florida Classical Review. Nov. 1, 2010.
- Budmen, Lawrence. "Pianist Rodriguez’s life and career come full circle at University of Miami." South Florida Classical Review, Oct. 12, 2010.
- Cuvo, Angela. "Cuban-born Pianist Brings Musical Talents to S.A." La Prensa Vol. 16 n. 39, September 22, 2010.
- Davis, Peter G.. "No Contest". New York Magazine, November 4, 1985, pp. 74-75.
- Dixon, T.L. "Raves for Rodriguez." Musical America, 1990, Vol. 10 Issue n. 5, p. 18.
- Elder, Dean. "How a Young Virtuoso Practices: an Interview with Santiago Rodriguez." Clavier, 1978, Vol. 17 Issue n. 4, pp. 10-14.
- Gerber, L. "A Conversation with Santiago Rodriguez." Fanfare: the Magazine for Serious Record Collectors, 1992, Vol. 15 Issue n. 3, pp. 107-11.
- Holland, Bernard. "Review/Piano: Rachmaninoff Evening by Santiago Rodriguez." New York Times, March 29, 1992.
- Killian, Michael. "Expatriate Prodigy: Pianist Rodriguez Escaped Cuba at 8." Chicago Tribune December 3, 1992.
- Lane, Chester. "Running on Repertoire." Symphony, 1992, Vol. 43 Issue n. 2, pp. 16-19.
- Mangan, Timothy. "Competitions, Cuba Leave Bitter Taste", Los Angeles Times, March 8, 1991
- Manildi, Donald. "Santiago Rodriguez." Musical America, 1990, Vol. 110 Issue n. 5, pp. 16-17.
- Manildi, Donald. "Guide to Records: Santiago Rodriguez." American Record Guide, Jan/Feb 1995, Vol. 58 Issue n.1, p157.
- Marabella, Jean. "Quiet Cuban Airlift Altered 14,000 Lives." Baltimore Sun, Jan. 23, 2000.
- March, Ivan; Greenfield, Edward; Layton, Robert. The Penguin Guide to Recorded Classical Music 2010. Penguin, 2009
- McLellan, Joseph. "Santiago Rodriguez, Playing with Élan." Washington Post, June 7, 1998.
- McLellan, Joseph. "The Little Record Company That Could." Washington Post, April 1, 1990.
- McLellan, Joseph. "Some Big Names Fit Well on Small Labels." Washington Post, Nov. 6, 1994.
- Phillip, Scott. "Ginastera: Danzas Argentinas, Piano Sonata No. 1..." Fanfare, July 1, 2010.
- Roberts, Ed. "Misplaced Earrings Save Day." Washington Post, Jan. 21, 1993.
- Rodriguez, Santiago. "A Pianist's World: In Praise of Teachers." Virtuoso & Keyboard Classics, 1986, Vol. 6 Issue n. 6, pp. 43-44
- Rodriguez, Santiago. "Falling in Love with Rachmaninoff." Virtuoso & Keyboard Classics, 1992, Vol. 12 Issue n. 2, pp. 10-11.
- Scherer, B. "Cuban Rhythms: An Interview with Santiago Rodriguez." Gramophone, May 1990. Vol. 67, p11.
- Stearns, David Patrick. "Santiago Rodriguez." Clavier, 1988, Vol. 27 Issue n. 5, pp. 4-7.
- Sun, Howard. "Maryland Pianist Gave Up First Love for Music." Baltimore Sun, Jan. 17, 1997.
- Teare, Paul W. "Rodriguez, In Sync with Rachmaninoff." Washington Post, Oct. 19, 1993.
- Weinraub, Judith. "The Pianist's Tricky Passage; Music was the ticket for Santiago Rodriguez." Washington Post, Sept. 25, 1992.
- Wigler, Stephen. "Rodriguez's Rachmaninoff has silken textures.". Baltimore Sun, September 24, 1995.
- Wigler, Stephen. "Rodriguez Brings a Latin Flair to Piano." Baltimore Sun, July 25, 1994.
