= Romantic revival =

The Romantic revival in European classical music arose in the 1960s after decades of relatively conservative and traditional offerings by the world's concert presenting organizations and record companies.

After World War II there was an over-emphasis on the canon of standard “great masterpieces”, co-existing with disdain for any music that was perceived as not profound in intent. The gray and uninteresting scope of music at the time was complemented by attempts to have contemporary twelve-tone music accepted into the mainstream. Similarly, there was a widespread and profound change in the way music was taught, with the traditional conservatory bar-by-bar reading of the text (score) replacing the earlier centuries' interest in spontaneity, imagination and personality in performance.

This revitalization of the musical scene was brought about by a number of musicians who had been trained in the old style, and a smaller number of musicologists and music company executives who were interested in viable compositions that had been excluded from the canon, as well as more flexible and expressive ways of performing. The subject was one of the favorites of Harold C. Schonberg, then music critic of the New York Times. Schonberg credited Frank Cooper and his Festival of Neglected Romantic Music with jump starting the revival. In the 1970s, through reviews in Records & Recording, Ates Orga championed the movement in Britain, leading later to his 1994 Virtuoso Romantics series with Marc-André Hamelin at the Wigmore Hall. Now in the beginning of the 21st century, because of those efforts, the repertoires of orchestras, string quartets, opera houses, ballet troupes and solo instrumentalists are far more likely to contain a wide variety of music from all periods, including 19th century works by composers other than Beethoven, Schubert and Brahms, that had been previously excluded before the revival.

This late 20th century movement is to be distinguished from the late 18th century movement known as Romanticism.

In January 2023, the Romantic Revival Orchestra was formed by Royal Birmingham Conservatoire composition student, Wiktor Wysocki, in an effort to bring new orchestral and chamber music stemming from the romantic tradition to the public. "The RRO was founded with a purpose in mind: to revive Romantic music in the wider classical genre, in a relevant and modern style hence, Romantic-Revival."

This emerging, 21st century movement is characterised by its emphasis on new music, in contrast to 20th century Romantic revival, and aims to "...champion new romantic music alongside the well-known and obscure works of previous generations of composers." "The RRO is intended to be a platform for composers to express their emotions in a colorfully tonal and refreshing way, in an overly grey and monotonous world."
