= Marvis Martin =

American operatic soprano

Marvis Lynn Martin (born April 7, 1954) is an American operatic soprano best known for her concert performances and recitals, including her renditions of Joseph Canteloube's Songs from the Auvergne and of Bess in Bobby McFerrin's touring concert version of Porgy and Bess.

Hailed as "a lyric soprano of unusual brightness, evenness and quality" by The New York Times and winner of several competition prizes, Martin is acclaimed for her "beauty of voice and sensitive communication, receiving awards, medals and glowing reviews as a song recitalist, concert singer, and opera performer."

== Early life and education ==
Martin was born in Tallahassee, Florida, but grew up in Miami, where she sang professionally by age five. She trained at the University of Miami's Frost School of Music, earning a Bachelor of Music degree in 1977. She subsequently obtained a master's degree from the Manhattan School of Music. She then studied under Elisabeth Schwarzkopf and was also a protégée of Alice Tully.

== Career ==
Martin made her professional debut in 1981 as part of the Young Concert Artists Series; the New York Times review called her "promising" and said that "at her best, she displayed a talent and a temperament that could make her an important singer." She debuted with the Metropolitan Opera in 1982, singing the role of "Pamina" in a touring production of The Magic Flute. Over the next few years, she received "awards, medals and glowing reviews as a song recitalist, concert singer and opera performer." At the Met, she performed in operas like Boris Godunov, Don Carlo, Ariadne auf Naxos, Porgy and Bess, and Idomeneo.

As her career matured, she focused more on recitals and concert performances than opera, claiming, "I love opera, but don't necessarily love all the hubbub." She has also slowed her touring pace, saying, "I don't think that's a healthy way of life [...] I love going to the next city, but my jobs are spread out nicely." She has performed with numerous orchestras, including the Boston Symphony Orchestra and the New York Philharmonic, where music director and principal conductor Zubin Mehta programmed a piece for her.

Martin has said she especially enjoys returning to Florida for performances. In 1987, she was named the "Distinguished Alumni" honoree by the Frost School of Music at the University of Miami. In 1988, she was awarded the "Florida Prize," a $10,000 award by The New York Times Company "to a Florida native or resident for outstanding work in the visual and performing arts."

== Honors and awards ==
- Florida Prize. New York Times Company, regional newspaper group, 1988
- Distinguished Alumna. Frost School of Music. University of Miami, 1987
- Michaels Award of Young Concert Artists. Alice Tully Hall, Lincoln Center. New York NY, 1981
