= Frank Cooper (musicologist) =

American academic

- Born: 1938 (age 87–88); Atlanta, Georgia
- Education: Florida State University
- Occupations: Professor of Music, Frost School of Music at the University of Miami

Frank Cooper (born 1938, in Atlanta, Georgia) is currently Research Professor Emeritus, Musicology, at the Frost School of Music, University of Miami (Coral Gables, Florida), since retiring from his professorship in 2013, and is internationally known as the founder of the Festival of Neglected Romantic Music.

== Education ==
He studied at Florida State University with John Boda, Edward Kilenyi and Ernst von Dohnányi. From 1963 to 1977, he was a member of the faculty at Butler University in Indianapolis, Indiana.

== Conductor ==
In 1968, he founded the Festival of Neglected Romantic Music, which he directed until 1977. The Festival almost immediately attracted the attention of Harold C. Schonberg, music critic of The New York Times, who ultimately credited Cooper with personally jump-starting international interest in the Romantic Revival in music. Many seminal works of the Romantic era that had not been heard since the 19th century received their first performances at the Festival. Schonberg and other critics commented on the high professional level of the presentations, and certain specific performers became associated with the Festival.

After being the executive director of the Indianapolis Metropolitan Arts Council, Cooper moved to Miami, where he directed the Dade County Council of Arts and Sciences before returning to teaching, first at the New World School of the Arts, then at the University of Miami. In 1994, he founded the Coral Gables Mainly Mozart Festival, a chamber music series held each summer, for which he was artistic director until 2012.

== Pianist ==
As a pianist, his first recordings of piano concerti were by Brüll, Dreyschock and Raff, and of a substantial selection of salon music by Franz Hünten and Henri Herz (Genesis label). A selection of American harpsichord music that Cooper had just recorded for the American bicentennial in 1976 was lost when the producer left the master tapes on an Amtrak train, and they were never recovered. Cooper is often heard as both pianist and harpsichordist. He was the director of the Indianapolis Early Music Festival from 1973 to 2006.

The author of numerous annotations for LP and CD recordings, Cooper has published more than 50 articles on musical subjects, has provided program notes to major venues and has been the subject of numerous articles, reviews and broadcasts in the U.S., Canada, England, France, Italy, Netherlands and Serbia. A recipient of the Liszt Centennial Medal from the Hungarian Ministry of Culture, Cooper is senior advisor to Miami's Patrons of Exceptional Artists.

=== Piano recordings ===
- Ignaz Brüll: Concerto No. 2 in C Major, Op. 24, Zsolt Deaky conducting, Nurnberg Symphony (Genesis GS 1015)
- Alexander Dreyschock: Concert-Piece in c minor, Op. 27 and Joachim Raff: Concerto in c minor, Op. 185 (Genesis GS 1013), Zsolt Deaky conducting, Nurnberg Symphony
- Henri Herz: Selected Piano Works and Franz Hunten: Selected Piano Works ("Geniuses of the Parisian Salon") (Genesis GS 1006)
