= List of University of Miami faculty =

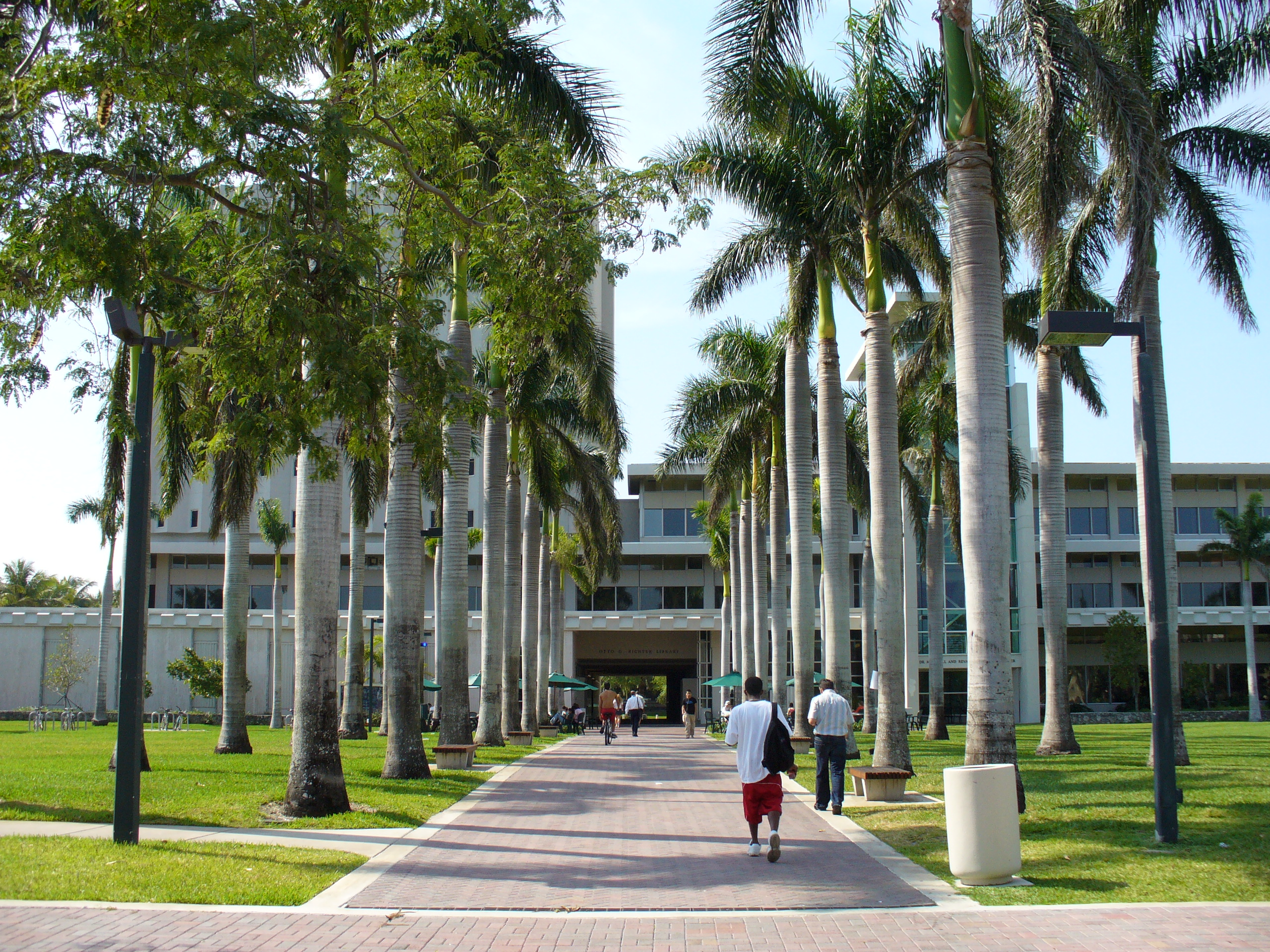
The University of Miami in Coral Gables, Florida in February 2010

This list of University of Miami faculty includes notable University of Miami faculty, including four Nobel Prize recipients and leaders in multiple academic disciplines.

Founded in 1925, the University of Miami is located in Coral Gables, Florida, 7 miles (11 km) south of Downtown Miami in the Miami metropolitan area, the largest metropolitan area in Florida, eighth-largest metropolitan area in the nation, and 70th-largest metropolitan area in the world.

The university offers 138 undergraduate, 140 master's, and 67 doctoral degree programs across 10 schools and colleges with over 350 majors and programs. It is a major research university with $520 million of annual research and sponsored program expenditures, making it the 61st-largest university for research in the nation.

Its undergraduate academic admissions standards are the highest of any university or college in the state of Florida, and the university is Carnegie-classified as: "Doctoral Universities: Very High Research Activity."

With over 21,000 faculty and staff, the University of Miami is the second-largest employer in Miami-Dade County, the most populous county in Florida and seventh-most populous county in the nation. The University of Miami campus spans 240 acres (0.97 km^{2}) and has over 5,700,000 square feet (530,000 m^{2}) of buildings. The university has an endowment of $1.71 billion as of 2025.

The university's athletic teams are collectively known as the Miami Hurricanes and compete in Division I of the National Collegiate Athletic Association. Its football team has won five national championships since 1983 and its baseball team has won four national championships since 1982.

== School of Architecture ==
- Walter Darby Bannard (Art and architecture)
- Jaime Correa (Community building)
- Elizabeth Plater-Zyberk (Urban planning)
- Vincent Scully (Architecture)
- Bonnie Seeman (Art and architecture)

== College of Arts and Sciences ==
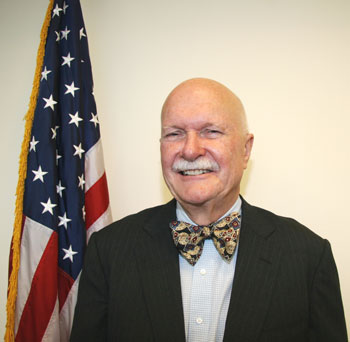
Peter Burleigh, University of Miami professor of international affairs and former U.S. ambassador to Sri Lanka and the Maldives, the United Nations, and India

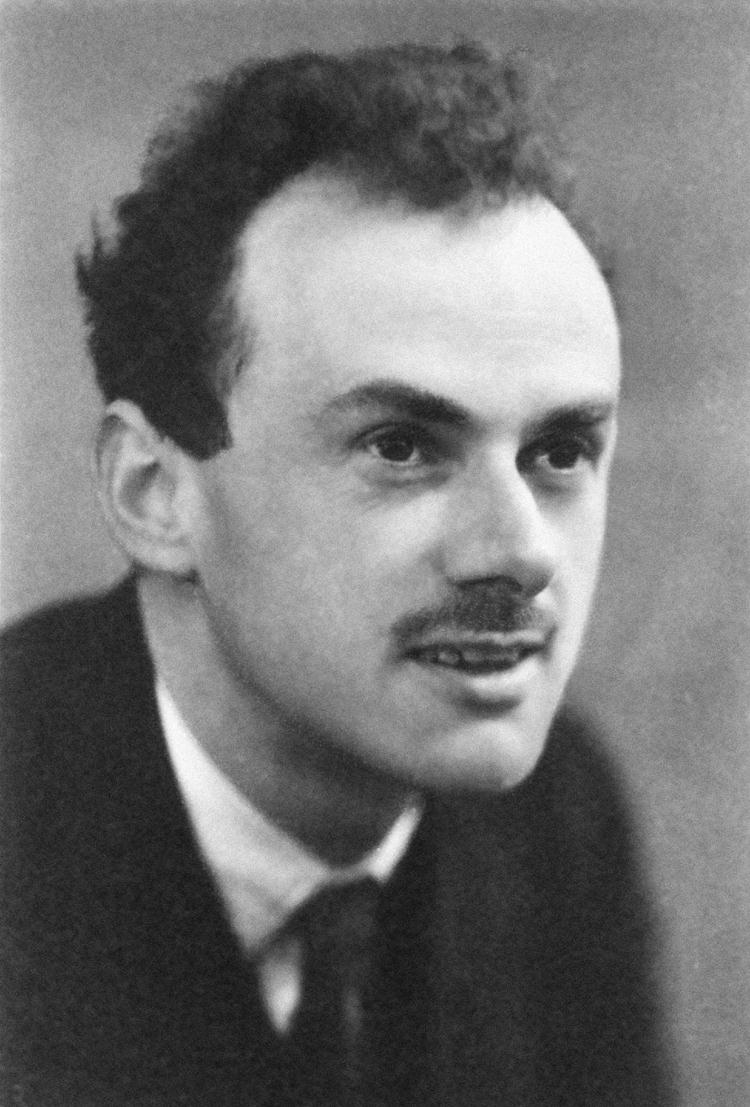
Paul Dirac, University of Miami professor of physics and Nobel Prize in Physics recipient

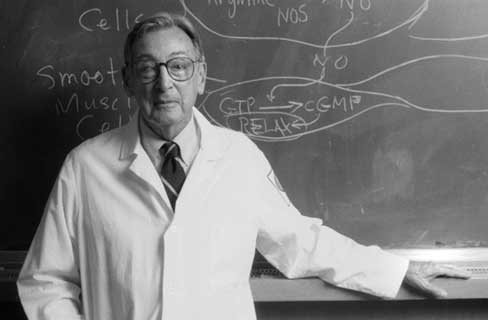
Robert F. Furchgott, University of Miami professor of pharmacology and Nobel Prize in Physiology or Medicine recipient

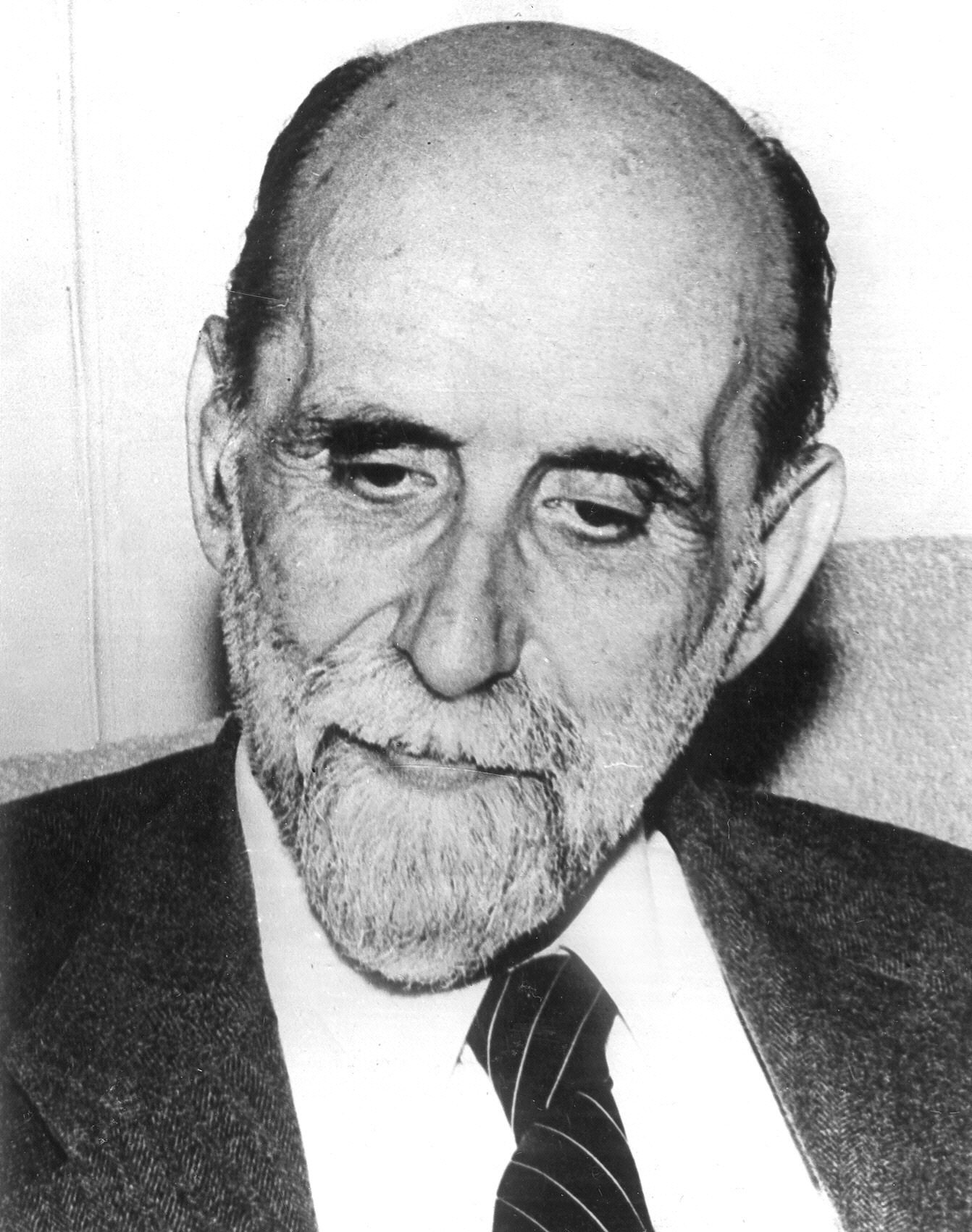
Juan Ramón Jiménez, University of Miami professor of literature and Nobel Prize in Literature recipient

- Edmund Abaka (Africa history)
- Hugo Achugar (Modern languages)
- Howard H. Aiken (Physics)
- Geoffrey Alpert (Sociology)
- Bruce Bagley (International affairs)
- Walter Darby Bannard (Painting)
- Bernard Benstock (English literature)
- Shari Benstock (English department chairperson, feminist literature)
- Harm de Blij (Geography)
- Stefan Brecht (Philosophy)
- Berit Brogaard (Philosophy)
- Peter Burleigh (International affairs)
- Vincent J. Cardinal (Theatre arts)
- Lowell Juilliard Carr (Sociology)
- Anjan Chakravartty (Philosophy)
- Robert Chambers (Art)
- Nirupa Chaudhari (Biology)
- Jack Clay (Speech)
- Stuart Corbridge (International affairs)
- Fred D'Aguiar (English and creative writing)
- Oscar Dathorne (African and Caribbean studies)
- Paul Dirac (Physics, Nobel Prize recipient)
- Edward L. Dreyer (China history)
- William Eamon (Science history)
- Franklin Einspruch (Art)
- Patricia Engel (Creative writing)
- Ron Feinberg (acting)
- Ariel Fernandez (Chemistry)
- Joseph Ford (Physics)
- László Fuchs (Mathematics)
- Robert F. Furchgott (Biochemistry, Nobel Prize recipient)
- Amina Gautier (Writing)
- Johannes Geiss (Physics)
- Seymour Ginsburg (Mathematics)
- Lester Goran (Creative writing)
- Leon Gouré (International affairs)
- Arnold H. Green (Middle East and North Africa)
- Henry Alan Green (Religious studies)
- Susan Haack (Philosophy)
- Peter Hargitai (English composition)
- Paula Harper (Art history)
- Nicole Hemmer (History)
- Kenneth T. Henson (Education)
- Paul Holdengräber (Writing)
- Amishi Jha (Psychology)
- Juan Ramón Jiménez (Literature, Nobel Prize recipient)
- Neil F. Johnson (Physics)
- Maxim Kontsevich (Mathematics)
- Pancheti Koteswaram (Meteorology)
- Behram Kurşunoğlu (Physics)
- Abraham Lavender (Sociology)
- Keith Lehrer (Philosophy)
- Luis E. Aguilar Leon (History)
- Robert M. Levine (Latin America studies)
- Walter K. Lew (Creative writing)
- Mary Lindemann (History chair)
- Mayme Logsdon (Mathematics)
- George Hill Mathewson Lawrence (Tropical botany)
- Christopher Layne (International affairs)
- Keith Lehrer (Philosophy)
- Abraham S. Luchins (Psychology)
- Michael McCullough (Psychology)
- Colin McGinn (Philosophy)
- Jennifer Morse (Mathematics)
- Julia Morton (Botany)
- Lars Onsager (Nobel Prize for Chemistry)
- Ivan Petrella (Religion)
- Joan R. Piggott (History)
- Alex Piquero (Sociology chair)
- Michael Rothberg (English)
- Guido Ruggiero (History)
- Una Ryan (Biology)
- Enrico Mario Santí (Hispanic literature)
- Jay M. Savage (Biology)
- Seth Schwartz (Psychology)
- Maureen Seaton (Creative writing)
- Bonnie Seeman (Art)
- Donna Shalala (Political science and health policy)
- Fred Singer (Planetary science)
- Michael Slote (Ethics)
- Karl Slotta (Biochemistry)
- Ranbir Chander Sobti (Biology)
- Donald Spivey (History chair)
- Kumble R. Subbaswamy (dean)
- Earl Wilbur Sutherland Jr. (Biochemistry, Nobel Prize recipient)
- Charlton W. Tebeau (History chair)
- John J. Tigert (Philosophy)
- Catherine Tufariello (Poetry)
- Joseph Uscinski (Political science)
- Carolyne Van Vliet (Physics)
- Barbara Ann Whitlock (Biology)
- Michelle L. Wachs (Mathematics)
- Nick Wilding (History)
- Roy O. Woodbury (Botany)
- Dewing Woodward (Art)
- Cosmas Zachos (Physics)
- Hermann Beck (History)

== School of Business ==
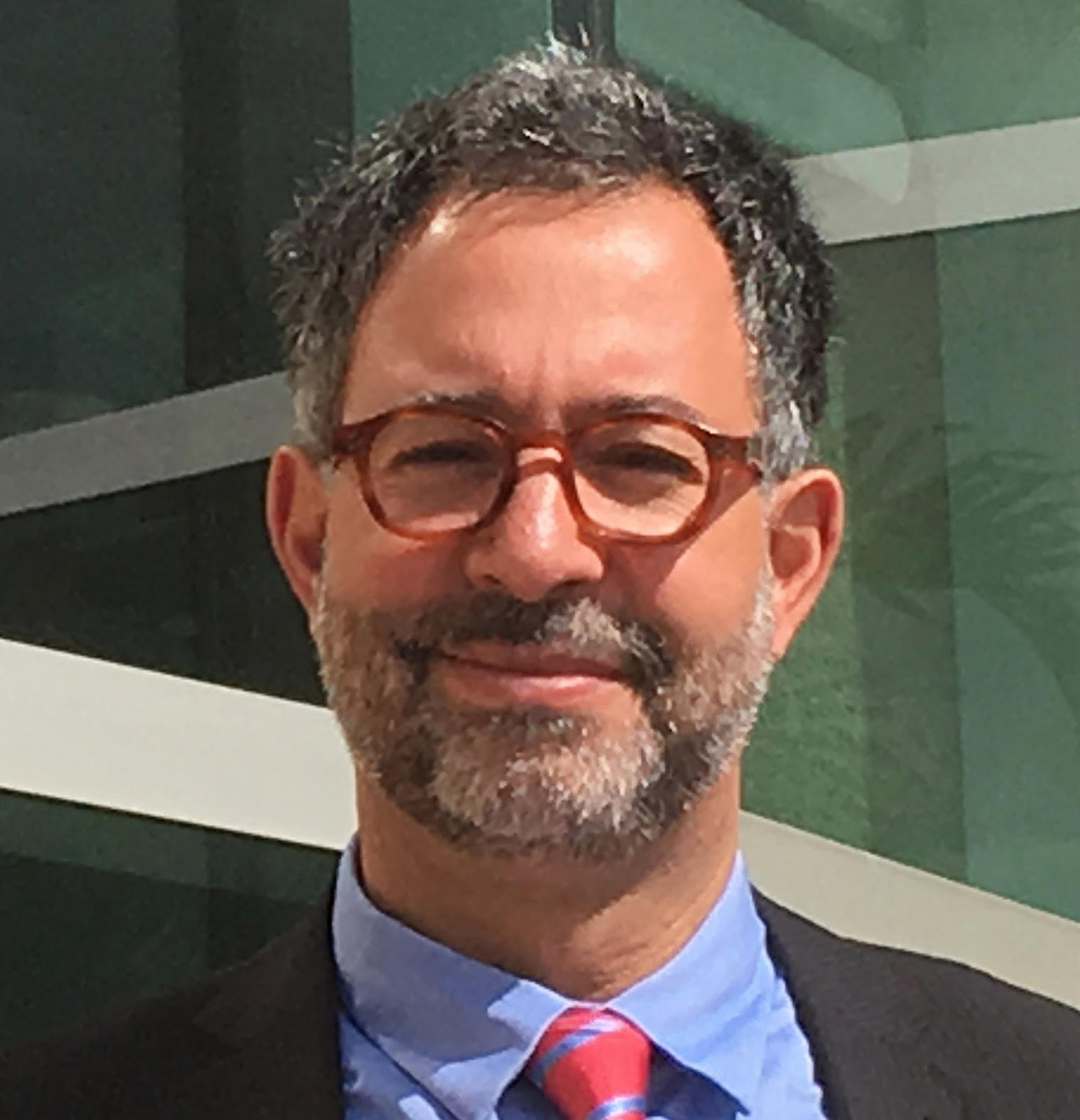
Aquiles Este, University of Miami professor of brand management at the University of Miami School of Business

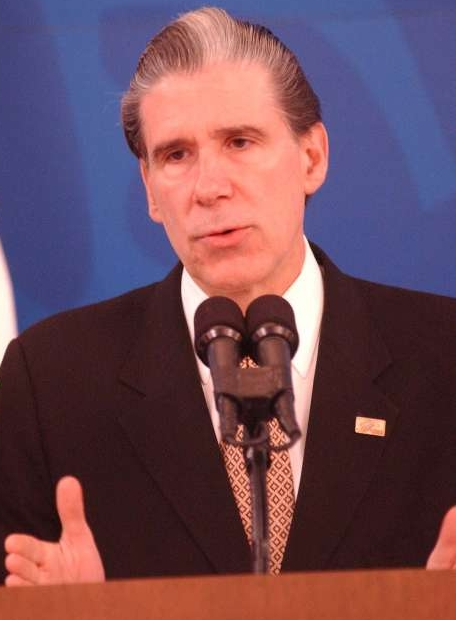
Julio Frenk, University of Miami president and professor of health sector management at Miami Herbert Business School

- Alex Azar (Senior executive in residence)
- Henrik Cronqvist (Vice dean and finance chair)
- Aquiles Este (Brand management)
- Julio Frenk (Health sector management)
- Borko Furht (Computer science)
- David B. Hertz (Management science)
- Yadong Luo (Management chair)
- Modesto Maidique (Business management)
- Linda L. Neider (Management chair)
- A. Parasuraman (Marketing chair)
- John Quelch (dean)
- Neil Wallace (Economics)
- Noah Williams (Economics)

== School of Communication ==
- Andrew Barton (Broadcast journalism)
- Alberto Cairo (Visual journalism)
- Michael Carlebach (Photojournalism)
- Melvin Defleur (Communications)
- Michelle Kaufman (Sports journalism)
- William Rothman (Cinematic arts)

== School of Education and Human Development ==
- Kenneth T. Henson (Education)
- Okhee Lee (Education)
- Eugene F. Provenzo (Teaching and learning)

== College of Engineering ==
- Norman Einspruch (dean)
- Andrew Hsu (Aerospace engineering)
- Eliahu I. Jury (Electric engineering)
- Shahriar Negahdaripour (Electrical engineering)
- James M. Tien (dean)
- Turhan Nejat Veziroğlu (Mechanical engineering)
- Lin Zonghu (Thermal engineering)

== School of Law ==
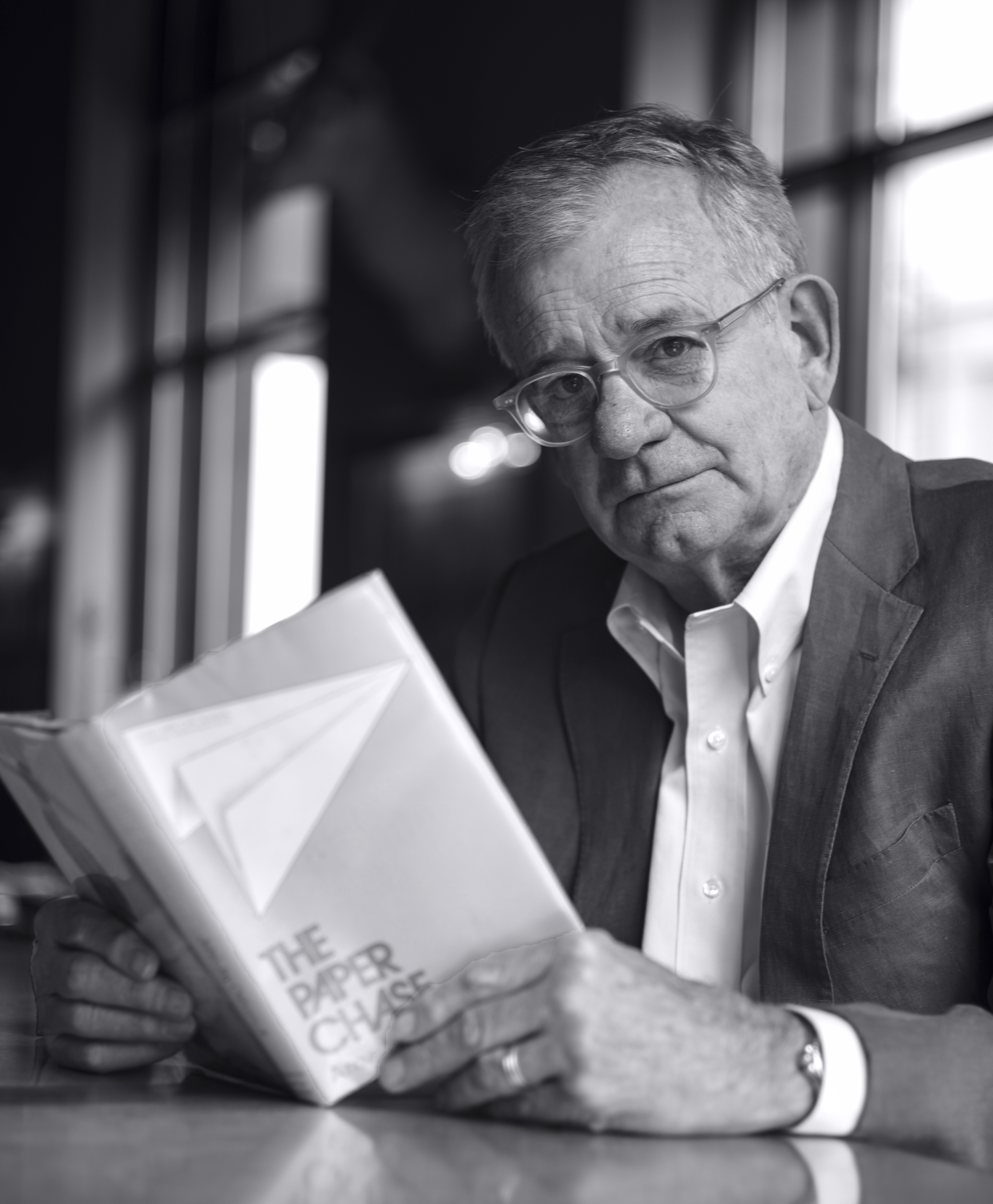
John Jay Osborn Jr., University of Miami professor of contract law and author of The Paper Chase

- David Abraham (Law)
- Alan S. Becker (Evidence law)
- Rafael Celestino Benítez (Interim dean and international law)
- Edgar S. Cahn (Law)
- Tim Canova (Law)
- Donna Coker (Domestic violence law)
- Linton McGee Collins (Law)
- A. Jay Cristol (Bankruptcy law)
- John Hart Ely (Constitutional law)
- Paul Finkelman (Legal history)
- Mary Anne Franks (Law)
- Ira J. Kurzban (Immigration law)
- Stanley Langbein (Administrative law)
- Soia Mentschikoff (dean)
- Marilyn Milian (Criminal law)
- John Jay Osborn Jr. (Contract law)
- Jan Paulsson (International arbitration)
- John A. Powell (Civil rights law)
- Robert Raben (Law)
- Edgardo Rotman (Criminal law)
- Thomas Scott (Law)
- Jonathan Simon (Criminal justice)
- Rodney Smith (Law)
- Stephen Urice (Cultural heritage law)
- Paul R. Verkuil (acting dean)
- Bruce Winick (Mental health law)

== School of Marine, Atmospheric, and Earth Science ==
- Frederick Bayer (Marine biology)
- Lisa Beal (Oceanography)
- Amy C. Clement (Global climate change)
- Cesare Emiliani (Geology and geophysics chair)
- Rana Fine (Oceanography)
- Sumner Gerard (Marine archaeology)
- Samuel H. Gruber (Marine biology and fisheries)
- Roger Lhermitte (Meteorology)
- Claire Paris (Ocean science)
- José Carlos Millás (Meteorology)
- C. Richard Robins (Ichthyology)
- Elizabeth Rona (Marine science)
- F.G. Walton Smith (Oceanography and school's founder)
- Sharon L. Smith (Ecology)
- Fred Tappert (Physics)
- Gilbert L. Voss (Oceanography and conservation)

== School of Medicine ==
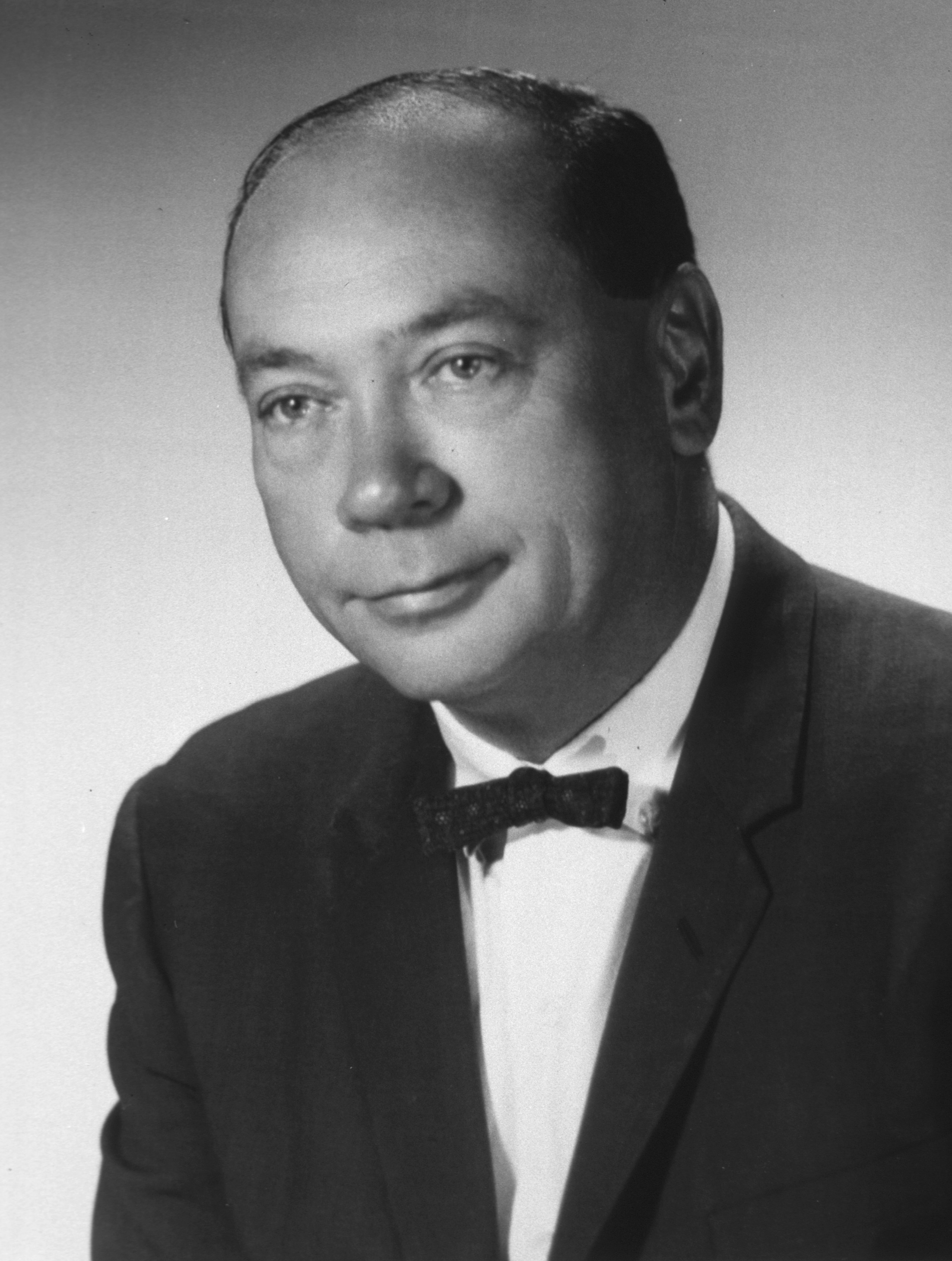
Earl Wilbur Sutherland Jr., University of Miami professor of biochemistry and Nobel Prize in Physiology or Medicine recipient

- Maria T. Abreu (Gastroenterology)
- A. Bernard Ackerman (Dermatology)
- Thomas J. Balkany (Neurotology and otorhinolaryngology)
- Mary Bartlett Bunge (Neuroscience and paralysis)
- Gaetano Ciancio (Organ transplantation)
- Robert B. Daroff (Neurology and ophthalmology)
- Steven Falcone (Neuroradiology)
- Jeff Farmer (Genetics and physical activity)
- Tiffany Field (Infant development)
- Margaret Fischl (HIV/AIDS)
- Pascal J. Goldschmidt (Cardiology)
- Alan Heldman (Cardiology)
- Sung-lan Hsia (Dermatology)
- Howard Landy (Neurosurgery)
- Erin Marcus (Internal medicine)
- Deborah Mash (Neurology and pharmacology)
- Jacques Morcos (Neurosurgery)
- Mark T. Nelson (Pharmacology)
- Charles Nemeroff (Psychiatry chair)
- William Nyhan (Pediatrics)
- Martin J. Tobin (Pulmonology)
- Kazi Mobin-Uddin (Vascular surgery)
- Georgios Papanikolaou (Cancer research)
- Dipen J Parekh (Urology)
- Margaret Pericak-Vance (Genetics)
- Jochen Reiser (Anatomy and cell biology)
- Camillo Ricordi (Metabolic disorders)
- Tatjana Rundek (Neurology)
- Ralph L. Sacco (Neurology)
- Jay Skyler (Pediatrics)
- Ranbir Chander Sobti (Cell biology)
- Earl Wilbur Sutherland Jr. (Biochemistry)
- Martin J. Tobin (Pulmonology)
- Claes Wahlestedt (Therapeutic innovation)
- W. Dean Warren (Surgery)
- Paul Alan Wetter (Surgery)
- William Joseph Whelan (Molecular biology)

== School of Music ==
- Shelly Berg (dean and jazz piano)
- John Bitter (dean and symphony orchestra)
- Vincent J. Cardinal (Musical theater)
- Frank Cooper (Musicology and piano)
- Robert MacArthur Crawford (Music composition)
- Ivan Davis (Piano)
- Jim Bob Floyd (Keyboard performance chair)
- Harry Glantz (Trumpet)
- Gary Green (Wind ensemble)
- James William Hipp (dean)
- Brian Lynch (Jazz)
- Kevin Mahogany (Jazz)
- Pat Metheny (Guitar)
- Craig Morris (Trumpet)
- Julián Orbón (Composition)
- Jaco Pastorius (Bass)
- Samuel Pilafian (Tuba)
- Bill Porter (Audio engineering)
- Paul Posnak (Chamber music)
- Alfred Reed (Music media and industry)
- Santiago Rodriguez (Keyboards)
- Steve Rucker (Drums)
- Jo-Michael Scheibe (Choral)
- Arminda Schutte (Classical piano)
- Thomas Sleeper (Orchestra)
- Earle Chester Smith (Piano)
- Hugh Roderick Thompson (Voice)
- Richard Todd (French horn)
- Constance Weldon (Assistant dean and Tuba)
- Clifton Williams (Music theory and composition)
- Paul Wilson (Music theory and composition)
- Dorothy Ziegler (Opera theater)

== School of Nursing and Health Studies ==
- Nilda Peragallo (Women's health)

== University of Miami presidents ==
- Bowman Foster Ashe, 1926–1952
- Jay F. W. Pearson, 1952–1962
- Henry King Stanford, 1962–1981
- Edward T. Foote II, 1981–2001
- Donna Shalala, 2001–2015
- Julio Frenk, 2015–2024

== Other ==
- Werner A. Baum (vice president of academic affairs and dean of faculties)
- Henry Fillmore (Band of the Hour composer)
- Fiona Kelleghan (Metadata librarian)
- William Franklin Lee III (dean, vice president and provost)
- Ruth Bryan Owen (administrator)

== See also ==
- List of University of Miami alumni
