= University of Miami Division of Surgical Neurooncology =

Academic department in Florida, US

- Type: Division of Surgical Neurooncology at University of Miami School of Medicine
- Established: 1962
- Affiliations: University of Miami
- Dean: Allan Levi, MD
- Location: Miami, Florida, U.S. 25.788714°N 80.214397°W
- Campus: University of Miami School of Medicine
- Website: med.miami.edu/en/departments/neurosurgery

The University of Miami Division of Surgical Neurooncology is the neurological surgery center at the University of Miami's Miller School of Medicine and one of the largest and most comprehensive programs for brain tumor treatment in the United States. It is located in Miami.

The center is the only medical center in South Florida that offers comprehensive approaches and treatments for brain tumors, including offering patients interdisciplinary team assessments that include the university's departments of neurosurgery, neurology, radiation therapy, and oncology. Patient management paradigms are case-specific and tailored to individual patient needs with patient-specific treatment protocols.

== History ==
University of Miami's Division of Surgical Neurooncology was founded in 1959 by David Reynolds and was originally a division under the University of Miami's Department of Surgery. In 1962, Reynolds was appointed the division's chairman and served in this role until 1971 when the department established autonomy from the Department of Surgery. From 1971 until 1994, the division's chairman was Hubert L. Rosomoff, who also served as chairperson of the University of Miami neurooncology residency program for the University of Miami School of Medicine medical students.

Since its founding, the department has grown to include additional centers, including the Miami Project to Cure Paralysis, which has been cited as the "world’s largest, most comprehensive research center dedicated to spinal cord injury." Located in Miami, the University of Miami Medical Center includes Jackson Memorial Hospital.

=== Leadership ===
The department's past co-chairpersons from 1995 until 2015 were Barth A. Green, founder of Project Medishare for Haiti, and Roberto C. Heros. In 2015, Green and Heros were succeeded by co-chairpersons Allan Levi and Jacques J. Morcos.

The division's physicians include:

- Ronald Benveniste MD PhD
- Roberto C. Heros MD
- Michael E. Ivan MD MBS
- Jonathan Jagid MD
- Ricardo J. Komotar MD
- Howard Landy MD
- Jacques Morcos MD

=== Treatments ===
Treatment options at the University of Miami include clinical trial participation, vaccine development, neurological surgeries, adjuvant therapies, and laboratory research aimed at improving outcomes on even the most challenging brain tumors. University of Miami neurosurgeons also have expertise in CyberKnife® radiosurgery and work with radiation oncologists to utilize radiation therapies in the most effective ways.

University of Miami's division of surgical neurooncology is a tertiary referral center for South Florida, the Caribbean, Central America, and the rest of Latin America. The University of Miami treats a large number of patients with all types of brain tumors. The division also has published hundreds of research articles in peer-reviewed journals and book chapters since its founding.

=== Heat shock protein vaccine trial ===
The University of Miami's division of surgical neurooncology is one of only a few United States facilities, along with Johns Hopkins Hospital, Columbia University Medical Center, and University of California San Francisco, offering heat shock protein vaccine clinical trials in neurooncology treatment.

These clinical trials are available typically to newly-diagnosed patients with glioblastoma multiforme and involve the use of HSPPC-96 in an attempt to activate patients' immune systems against the tumor antigen, which can prevent recurrence. Preliminary findings suggest the approach has promise against cancer. The University of Miami is the only center conducting this trial in the state of Florida.
