= Patrick Farrell (photojournalist) =

American photojournalist (born 1959)

Patrick Farrell (born July 1, 1959) is a Pulitzer Prize-winning American photojournalist for the Miami Herald.

In 2009, his images from a brutal hurricane season in Haiti won the Pulitzer Prize for Breaking News Photography. The Pulitzer Prize jurors described his package of 19 black-and-white photographs as "provocative, impeccably composed images of despair after Hurricane Ike and other lethal storms caused a humanitarian disaster in Haiti." Titled A People in Despair: Haiti's Year Without Mercy, the photos ranged from the flooded streets of Gonaives and the aftermath of a storm-related school collapse in Port-au-Prince to the deadly toll on the rural town of Cabaret, where young children drowned in rushing floodwaters. More than 800 Haitians died and more than 1 million were left homeless by the series of storms.

Farrell's photographs from Haiti also have received first place recognition from Pictures of the Year International and the Overseas Press Club, and other awards.

== Early life and education ==
Farrell was born in Miami on July 1, 1959, the seventh of 12 children born to Dr. James and Peggie Farrell. Farrell says he owes his discovery of photography to an eye injury he suffered when he was shot in the right eye by a BB gun pellet while he was trick-or-treating on Halloween in 1971. He spent a week with both eyes bandaged shut at Larkin General Hospital in South Miami. His view of the world changed after his bandages were removed, and he began to pay more attention to the details and light around him, Farrell says. As a result of the eye injury, Farrell is a left-eye shooter and holds the camera up to his left eye. After he discovered photography, he destroyed a bathroom in his parents' home by turning it into a darkroom.

He is a 1977, graduate of Christopher Columbus High School, an all-boys Catholic school in Miami. He graduated from the University of Miami in 1981, with a bachelor's degree in television and film production. He credits longtime School of Communication professor Michael Carlebach for influencing his decision to pursue photojournalism as a career.

== Career ==
Farrell has been a staff photographer at the Miami Herald since 1987. He was part of the newspaper's staff that won the 1993, Pulitzer Prize for Public Service for coverage of Hurricane Andrew. He was the National Press Photographers Association's Region 6 Newspaper Photographer of the Year in 1992 and 1993.

He has been twice named Southern Photographer of the Year at the Southern Short Course (1989 and 1993), the country's longest-running photojournalism seminar.

Farrell has documented major news events in Florida and abroad, including the 1989 race riots in Miami's Overtown neighborhood; political and civil unrest in Haiti during the 1994 military rule of that country; the 1999 earthquake in Turkey; the Columbine High School massacre; childhood poverty in the Americas; Hurricane Andrew's 1992 path of destruction in South Florida; and social and political change in Cuba. After winning the Pulitzer in 2009, Farrell returned to Haiti with a team of Miami Herald reporters and photographers who covered the 2010 Haiti earthquake.

He was one of 10 journalists from around the world awarded Dart Center Ochberg Fellowships in 2010, from the Dart Center for Journalism and Trauma and Columbia University's Graduate School of Journalism. The fellowships are for mid-career journalists seeking to deepen their understanding and coverage of violence and traumatic events.

In 2015, Farrell worked with Doctors Without Borders to document unsafe and illegal abortions in Haiti as part of "Because Tomorrow Needs Her," a multimedia project that highlights health issues women face in developing countries around the world.

Farrell is an adjunct faculty member at Florida International University's School of Journalism and Mass Communication.

== Personal life ==
Farrell lives in Miami. He is married to former Miami Herald reporter Jodi Mailander Farrell, and they have two daughters, Annie and Lucy.

== Awards ==
- 1989: Southern Photographer of the Year, Southern Short Course
- 1992: Region 6 Newspaper Photographer of the Year, National Press Photographers Association
- 1992: Best In Show and Best Portfolio, Atlanta Photojournalism Seminar
- 1993: Region 6 Newspaper Photographer of the Year, National Press Photographers Association
- 1993: Pulitzer Prize for Public Service, awarded to the staff of the Miami Herald
- 1993: Southern Photographer of the Year, Southern Short Course
- 2008: Feature Photography Award for best feature photography published in any medium on an international theme, Overseas Press Club
- 2008: First Place, Newspaper, Spot News, Pictures of the Year International
- 2008: First Place, Newspaper, News Picture Story, Pictures of the Year International
- 2009: Pulitzer Prize for Breaking News Photography, Miami Herald
- 2009: National Headliner Award, First Place, Photo Essay

== Exhibitions ==
Farrell has exhibited his work at the A/E District gallery in Miami's Wynwood Art District to raise money for the Haiti-based dance company Ayikodans and has lectured as part of the Leica Lounge lecture series in Coral Gables, Fla. Farrell's images are part of an exhibit, "Capture the Moment: The Pulitzer Prize Photographs," that travels worldwide and appeared at the Frost Art Museum at Florida International University in Miami in 2014. Close to three million people have seen the touring exhibit, which is co-sponsored by the Newseum.
