= The Candy Butcher's Farewell =

1964 novel by Lester Goran

- First edition
- Author: Lester Goran
- Language: English
- Publisher: McGraw-Hill
- Publication date: 1964
- Publication place: USA
- Media type: Print (hardback)
- Pages: 278
- OCLC: 1148437
- Preceded by: Maria Light

The Candy Butcher's Farewell is a novel by the American writer Lester Goran set in the 1930s and 1940s in a small town near Pittsburgh, Pennsylvania and in Atlantic City, New Jersey

It tells the story of Henry Sneffer Jr., who after his mother dies goes to live with his Uncle Jonas, a slum lord, near Pittsburgh, where he endures his adolescence. Eventually he goes off on a quest for his father which leads him to the burlesque shows of Atlantic City.
