= Heldmann =

Heldmann is a German surname. Notable people with the surname include:

- Alois Heldmann (1895–1983), German World War I flying ace
- Carl Heldmann (born 1942), American writer
- Marcel Heldmann (born 1966), Swiss footballer

== See also ==
- Heldman
