= Heldman =

Heldman is a surname. Notable people with the surname include:

- Alan Heldman (born 1962), American interventional cardiologist
- Dennis R. Heldman (born 1938), food engineer
- Gladys Heldman (1922–2003), the founder of World Tennis magazine
- Julie Heldman (born 1945), American tennis player
- Michael Heldman (born 2003), American football player
- Seth Heldman (born 2001), American Rugby Performance Analyst

== See also ==
- Heldmann
