= The Paratrooper of Mechanic Avenue =

1960 novel by Lester Goran

- First edition
- Author: Lester Goran
- Language: English
- Publisher: Houghton Mifflin
- Publication date: 1960
- Publication place: United States
- Media type: Print (hardback)
- Pages: 243
- OCLC: 1673143

The Paratrooper of Mechanic Avenue is the first novel by the American writer Lester Goran. It is set in Pittsburgh, Pennsylvania, and spans a time period from the Great Depression to the postwar era.

It tells the story of Ike-o Hartwell, born into the fictional Pittsburgh slum of Sobaski's Stairway, and how he learns to survive amid the neon glow of pawn shops and poolrooms on Mechanic Avenue peopled by racketeers, pimps, gangs, and ward heelers. Then the army drafts him for the Korean War. After a dishonorable discharge, he dresses as a paratrooper and expects a hero's welcome back on Mechanic Avenue.
