= The Keeper of Secrets =

1971 novel by Lester Goran

The Keeper Of Secrets
- First edition
- Author: Lester Goran
- Language: English
- Publisher: McCall
- Publication date: 1971
- Publication place: USA
- Media type: Print (Hardback)
- Pages: 210

The Keeper of Secrets is a 1971 comic novel by the American writer Lester Goran.

It tells the story of a novelist, Shimen Groff, who after years of neglect is suddenly under consideration for the Nobel Prize for Literature. The novel is an account of his journey across the United States to collate various sections of his long-promised novel manuscript, ""Paradise, PA"".

At the time of publication, The Chicago Sun-Times declared that "imbued by Goran with a sharp wit and a fine sense of comic irony, Shimen is one of the best intellectual protagonists to come along in some time."

'Don't I Know You?', an extract from an as-yet-unpublished sequel called Unnatural Expectations, appeared in the first issue of the Australian literary journal Contrappasso in August 2012 alongside a career-ranging interview by Matthew Asprey.
