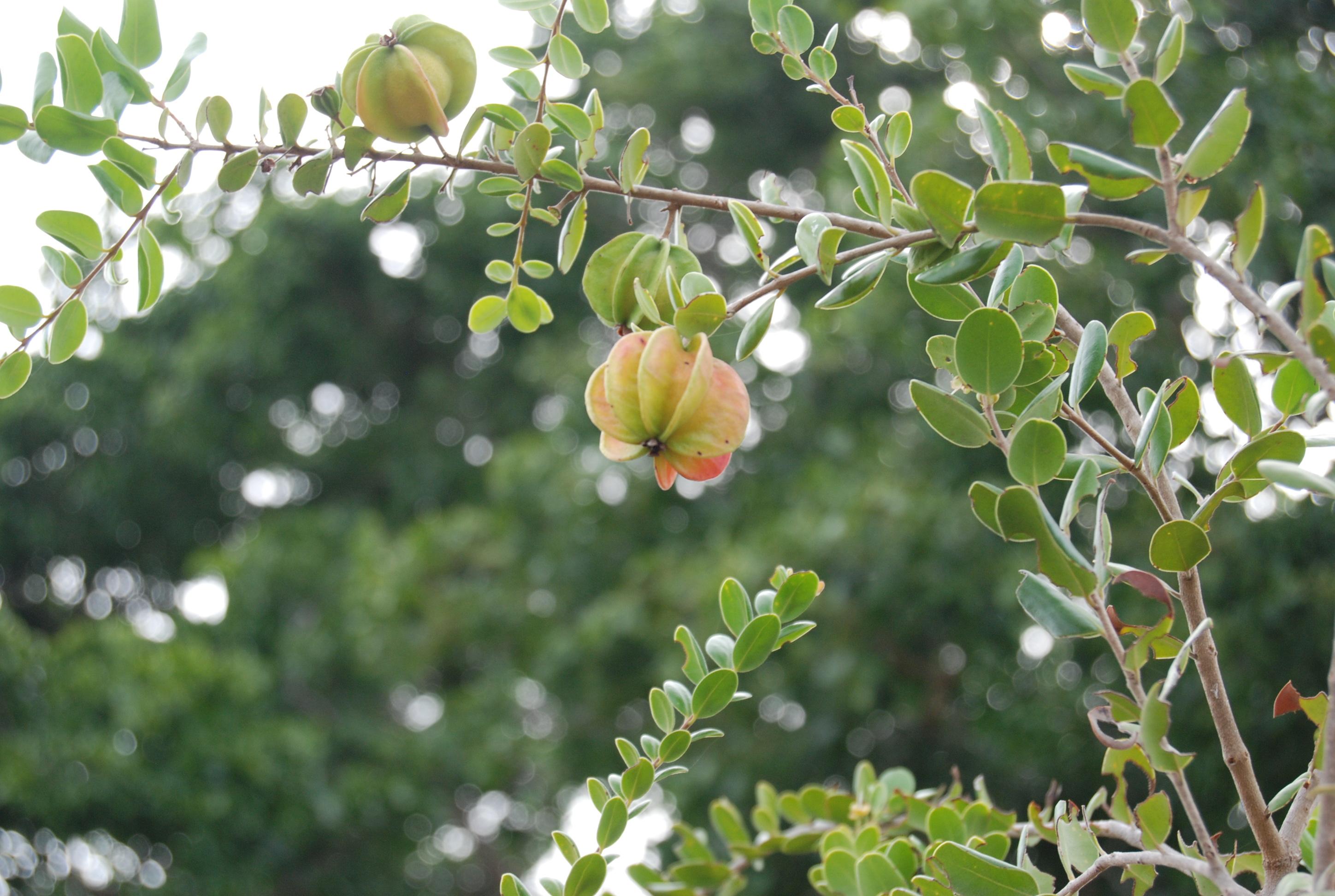

Conservation status
- Vulnerable (IUCN 3.1)

- Endangered (ESA)

Scientific classification
- Kingdom: Plantae
- Clade: Tracheophytes
- Clade: Angiosperms
- Clade: Eudicots
- Clade: Rosids
- Order: Myrtales
- Family: Myrtaceae
- Genus: Eugenia
- Species: E. woodburyana

Binomial name
- Eugenia woodburyana Alain

= Eugenia woodburyana =

Species of endangered plant

Eugenia woodburyana (Woodbury's stopper) is a species of flowering plant in the family Myrtaceae. It is endemic to Puerto Rico. It is a federally listed endangered species of the United States. It is threatened by habitat loss.

E. woodburyana is an evergreen tree which grows up to 6 metres (20 ft) tall. It has hairy oval leaves up to 2 centimeters long by 1.5 wide which are oppositely arranged. The inflorescence is a cluster of up to 5 white flowers borne in the leaf axils. The fruit is an approximately spherical red berry with eight wings, up to a diameter of 2 centimeters.

The tree grows in the Sierra Bermeja and the Guánica State Forest of Puerto Rico, and there is reportedly one individual in the Cabo Rojo National Wildlife Refuge. In 2024 there were 2,751 mature trees of this species remaining.

It is named for the botanist Roy Orlo Woodbury, an expert on Puerto Rican flora.
