= Ronald Benveniste =

American neurosurgeon

Ronald J. Benveniste is an assistant professor in the University of Miami Division of Surgical Neurooncology at the University of Miami, where he also serves as chief of neurosurgery at the University of Miami Hospital and Clinics and Sylvester Cancer Center.

Benveniste specializes in surgical neurooncology and is an avid researcher in radiosurgery for brain and pituitary tumors with a laboratory focus on molecular mechanisms for brain metastasis.

He has finished his residency at Mount Sinai School of Medicine and his fellowship at the MD Anderson Cancer Center. He has published several papers in the molecular mechanisms of cancer biology.
