= Tatjana Rundek =

American neurologist and epidemiologist

- Born: Zagreb, Croatia

Academic background
- Education: MS, Columbia University; PhD, LMU Munich; MD, School of Medicine, University of Zagreb

Academic work
- Institutions: Miller School of Medicine at the University of Miami; Columbia University

Tatjana Rundek is an American neurologist and epidemiologist. She is the Director of the Clinical Translational Research Division, Vice Chair of the Clinical Translational Research Neurology, and Evelyn F. McKnight Endowed Chair for Learning and Memory in Aging at the University of Miami's Miller School of Medicine.

== Early life and education ==
Rundek was born and raised in Zagreb, Croatia. She completed her PhD at LMU Munich and medical degree at the School of Medicine, University of Zagreb in 1990. Following this, she conducted her residency at Klinikum Großhadern. In 1997, she was one of the recipients of the Fulbright Scholarship from the J. William Fulbright Foreign Scholarship Board. Following her fellowship, Rundek enrolled at Columbia University for her Master's degree and medical fellowship.

== Career ==
Upon completing her education, Rundek joined the faculty at Columbia University as an assistant professor. In this role, she led and assisted in various studies regarding reducing one's risk of stroke and a heart attack. One study she assisted with suggested that brushing your teeth may reduce your risk of stroke and a heart attack. This was because people with gum disease are more likely to suffer from atherosclerosis. Another study found that the frequency of naps and the results of a mammogram test could predict one's risk of suffering from a stroke.

When her mentor Ralph L. Sacco was recruited to join the faculty at the University of Miami's Miller School of Medicine, he asked her to join him.

At the University of Miami, she also served on the editorial board of Stroke, Neurology and Cerebrovascular Diseases and President of the Neurosonology Community Practice of the American Institute of Ultrasound in Medicine. In 2016, Rundek was appointed the interim director of the Evelyn F. McKnight Brain Institute. In this role, she served as the principal investigator of several NIH grants to study how the population could overcome challenges of preserving and restoring brain health. Rundek also established the Miami McKnight Brain Institute Small Pilot Collaborative Award before being promoted to director in 2018. During the same year as her promotion, Rundek became the holder of the Evelyn F. McKnight Endowed Chair for Learning and Memory in Aging. Following her first year in these dual roles, Rundek was the co-winner of the Outstanding Woman in Science and Technology award from the Miami-Dade County Commission for Women and was appointed to serve on the Dr M Lee Pearce Foundation's Board of Directors.

During the COVID-19 pandemic in North America, Rundek was named President-Elect on the IAC Vascular Testing Board of Directors as a representative of the American Academy of Neurology. She also became the Director of the Clinical Translational Research Division and Vice Chair of the Clinical Translational Research Neurology.
