= Dipen J. Parekh =

American surgeon

Doctor Dipen J Parekh
- Born: 1969 (age 56–57); Mumbai, India
- Education: Pravara Institute of Medical Sciences
- Known for: Robotic surgery in Urologic-Oncology
- Scientific career
- Fields: Urologic-Oncology
- Workplaces: Miller School of Medicine; University of Miami
- Website: https://doctors.umiamihealth.org/provider/Dipen+J+Parekh/525779

Dipen J. Parekh (born in Mumbai, India) is the Chief Executive Officer of UHealth-University of Miami Health System and Executive Vice President for Health Affairs for the University of Miami, Chairman of Urology and the Dr. Victor Politano Endowed Chair in Clinical Urology at the Miller School of Medicine at University of Miami in Miami. He also serves as the Director of Robotic surgery at the University of Miami Health System.

In 2013, he was awarded the American Urological Association Gold Cystoscope Award for his excellence in "establishing programs in urologic oncology and robotic surgery and outstanding contributions in transformative research".

== Early life and education ==
A native of Gujarat, India, Parekh completed his MBBS at Pravara Institute of Medical Sciences, graduating in 1991. He underwent post graduate training in General Surgery (1995) and Urology (1998) from the University of Mumbai. He completed his residency (2004) in urology from Vanderbilt University Medical Center and a fellowship (2006) at Memorial Sloan Kettering Cancer Center in New York City. He also has a Masters in Healthcare Administration (2012) from Trinity University, Texas.

== Robotic surgery ==
He served as the University Chair in Urology and Chief of Robotic Surgery and Urologic Oncology at the University of Texas Health Science Center in San Antonio from 2007 to 2012.

In 2018, Parekh published the results of a clinical trial comparing Robotic Cystectomy vs. Open Cystectomy (RAZOR) in the medical journal The Lancet. The RAZOR trial provided high evidence that robotic surgery is non-inferior to traditional surgery for bladder cancer.

== Other contributions ==
When performing partial nephrectomy, many surgeons clamp the renal artery. Urologic dogma has been that every minute of clamp time is detrimental to long-term kidney function. Therefore, Parekh led a study investigating this by performing biopsies on clamped kidneys and found no significant long-term effects with up to 60 minutes of ischemia.
