= Bing Crosby's Last Song =

1998 novel by Lester Goran

- First edition
- Author: Lester Goran
- Language: English
- Publisher: Picador
- Publication date: 1998
- Publication place: USA
- Media type: Print (hardback)
- Pages: 288
- ISBN: 0-312-19540-0
- OCLC: 38964139

Bing Crosby's Last Song is a novel by the American writer Lester Goran set in 1968 in the Oakland neighbourhood of Pittsburgh, Pennsylvania.

It tells the story of Daly Racklin, a Pittsburgh attorney who on a spring day learns from his doctor that he has one year to live. Racklin is a de facto voice of a dying Irish neighborhood, and he is also torn by his father's shadow and ambitions of his own.

== Sources ==
- Contemporary Authors Online. The Gale Group, 2008.
