= The Demon in the Sun Parlor =

1968 novel by Lester Goran

The Demon In The Sun Parlor
- First edition
- Author: Lester Goran
- Language: English
- Publisher: New American Library
- Publication date: 1968
- Publication place: USA
- Media type: Print (Hardback)
- Pages: 181

The Demon in the Sun Parlor is a 1968 novel by the American writer Lester Goran, published by New American Library. Set in the late 1930s near Crandon Park in Miami, Florida, it follows a family whose household is gradually undone by a suggested demonic presence and by the descent of the youngest son into madness. It was Goran's fifth novel and his second published by New American Library, following The Stranger in the Snow (1966).

== Background ==
Goran, a Pittsburgh-born novelist, had taught English at the University of Miami since 1960, and The Demon in the Sun Parlor was one of his few books not set in his native Pittsburgh. In a 2008 interview with Matthew Asprey, Goran said the fictional house was not based on a real building, but that he chose the Crandon Park area because the zoo formerly located there made the setting feel unsettling. He described the zoo's mandrill as a central metaphor of the book, representing "'a kind of ancient evil that wouldn't leave'" beneath the surface of an outwardly beautiful world.

Goran also said the novel was written with the Vietnam War in mind, as an allegory of a self-professedly good nation confronting its own capacity for darkness. According to Goran, a film option on the novel was purchased by a producer who also held rights to works by Flannery O'Connor, but no film was made.

== Plot ==
Joseph Ludwig, once celebrated as the youngest stateside captain of the First World War, has never outgrown his idealized image of himself. Dismissed from the Miami fire department over a moment of cowardice he refuses to admit, he pours his energy into restoring a dilapidated old house near Crandon Park as a fortress for his family. The household is first disrupted by the arrival of relatives fleeing Nazi Germany, and then by a growing sense of menace around the house at night, accompanied by the sounds of the nearby zoo. Ludwig's son Eric shows signs of artistic genius, and his father converts the sun parlor into a studio to cultivate and exploit the boy's talent. Eric slides into criminal insanity and is accused of murder, while Ludwig refuses to recognize either his son's condition or the demonic presence in his home.

== Reception ==
Reviewing the novel on publication, Kirkus Reviews judged it "'Goran's best, most controlled book so far'", finding that it drew on the traditions of folk humor and demon tales to reach beyond light entertainment, and singling out the episode of the refugee cousins as shrewd satire. Kevin M. McCarthy included the novel in The Book Lover's Guide to Florida (1992), a survey of literature set in the state.
