= Mrs. Beautiful =

1985 novel by Lester Goran

- First edition
- Author: Lester Goran
- Language: English
- Publisher: New Horizon Press
- Publication date: 1985
- Publication place: USA
- Media type: Print (hardback)
- Pages: 239
- ISBN: 0-88282-010-9
- OCLC: 11784725

Mrs. Beautiful is a historical novel by the American writer Lester Goran set in 1909 in Pittsburgh, Pennsylvania.

It tells the story of Roxanne, a tough heroine from West Virginia who comes north to the boomtown of Pittsburgh. There she becomes involved with characters like Diamond Jim Brady, Lillian Russell, William Trautmann, as well as with events of the Pressed Steel Car Strike of 1909 in nearby McKees Rocks, Pennsylvania.
