= The Stranger in the Snow =

1966 novel by Lester Goran

- First edition
- Author: Lester Goran
- Language: English
- Publisher: The New American Library
- Publication date: 1966
- Publication place: USA
- Media type: Print (hardback)
- Pages: 211
- OCLC: 1313113

The Stranger in the Snow is a novel by the American writer Lester Goran set in the 1960s in Pittsburgh, Pennsylvania.

It tells the story of Harry Meyers, who is haunted by the ghost of man named Wilson who was killed, he thought, in Harry's place during World War II.
