= Claes Wahlestedt =

Swedish biomedical researcher

Claes Wahlestedt is a Swedish-American biomedical researcher and entrepreneur. He is a professor at the University of Miami.

== Research ==
He is the inventor of the so-called AntagoNAT oligonucleotide technology, which allows for upregulation of genes in genetic and other disorders. A number of small molecule drugs have also been discovered by or under Wahlestedt's direction.

== Career ==
He was a founding faculty member and director of neuroscience research at the Florida campus of The Scripps Research Institute (2005-2011). In recent years he has co-founded several biotechnology companies, including CuRNA Inc., which was acquired by OPKO Health in 2011, Epigenetix Inc. and Jupiter Orphan Therapeutics.
