= Carl Heldmann =

American author, home builder, and construction loan consultant

Carl Heldmann (born 1942) is an American author, home builder, and construction loan consultant.

== Personal life and his work ==
Heldmann has been a home builder for over 30 years and a construction loan consultant to credit unions for 20 years. He is also the founder of two schools of homebuilding, a former newspaper housing columnist, and author of several books on building your own home whose aggregate sales are more than ½ million copies. His book, Be Your Own General Contractor, has been in print for 25 years. The 5th edition was published in 2006. As of 2007, it had sold 300,000 copies.

In April 2008, in response to the mortgage crisis, he was quoted as saying "In terms of finding land you want at a good price, this is the best market that I have seen in my 30 years of home building," in Money Magazine.

The key element to Heldmann's written work, in both his books and his website is estimating costs in home construction. He breaks down the selling price or market value of a house as follows: 25% material, 25% labor, 25% land cost, 12.5% builder profit, & 12.5% builder overhead.

== Published works ==
- Be Your Own House Contractor (2006)
- How to Afford Your Own Log Home, 5th: Save 25 Percent without Lifting a Log (2002)
- Learn To Be A General Contractor : Build Your Dream House Or Do A Renovation (1998)
- Manage Your Own Home Renovation/How to Save 30% Without Lifting a Finger (1987)
