= Pravara Institute of Medical Sciences =

Education organization in Ahmednagar, India

- Type: Deemed to be University
- Established: 2003
- Chancellor: Dr. Rajedra Vikhe Patil
- Vice-Chancellor: Dr. V. N. Magare
- Administrative staff: 1100
- Undergraduates: 2000
- Postgraduates: 500
- Location: Loni, Ahmednagar, Maharashtra, India
- Campus: 111 acres; University
- Website: Official website

Pravara Institute of Medical Sciences is located in Ahmednagar, Maharashtra, India. Its parent trust, Pravara Medical Trust, was founded by Vithalrao Vikhe Patil in 1972 while the university was founded by Balasaheb Vikhe Patil. It was granted status by the University Grants Commission in 2003 as a Deemed University, but now with the recent changes made is to be called Deemed to be university.

== Constituent colleges ==
The deemed to be University has following constituent units:

- Dr. Balasaheb Vikhe Patil Rural Medical College (formerly Rural Medical College, Loni)
- Rural Dental College
- Dr. APJ Abdul Kalam College of Physiotherapy
- College of Nursing
- Centre for Biotechnology
- Centre for Social Medicine
