= Okhee Lee =

American education scholar

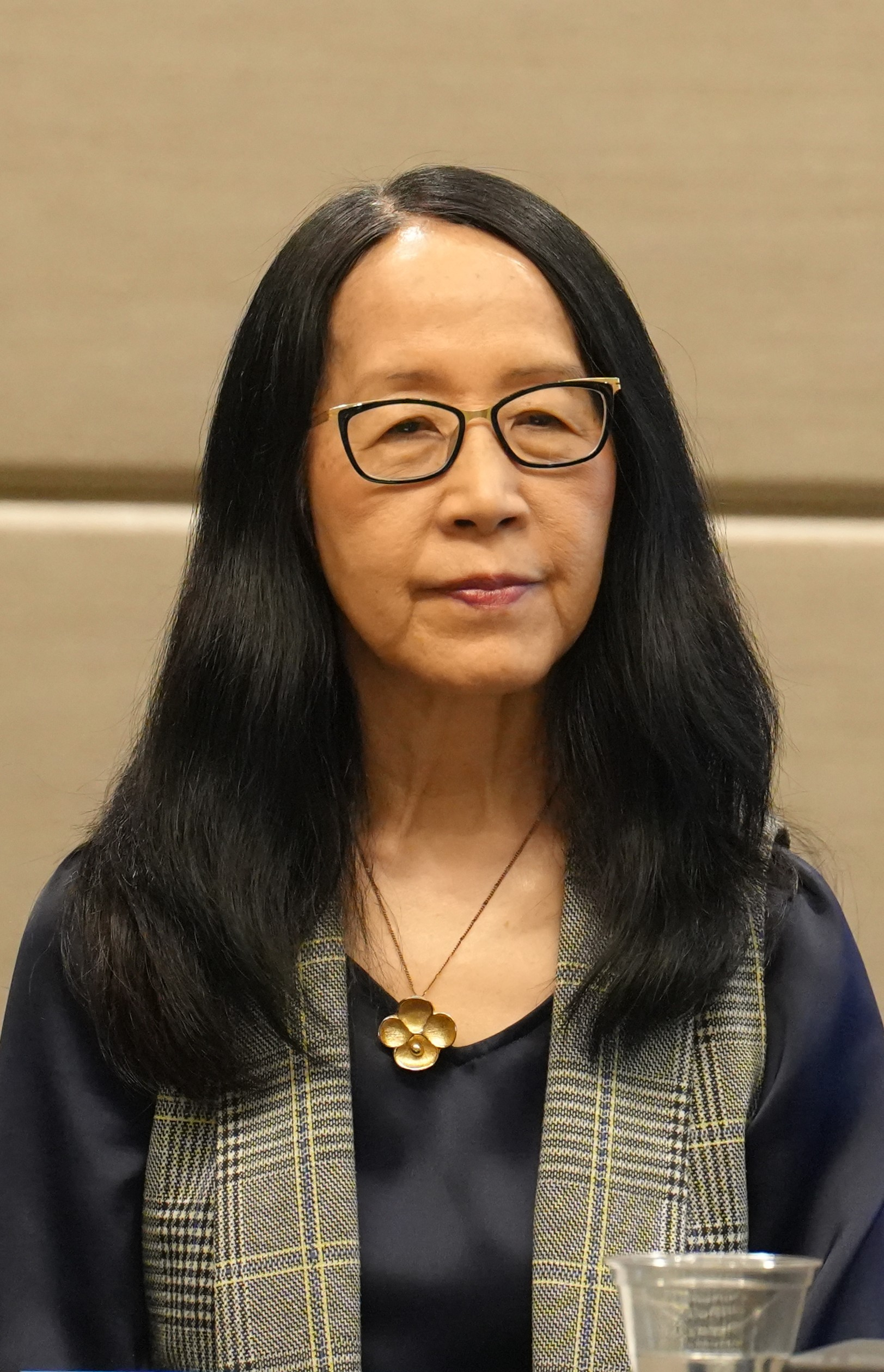
- Lee in 2026
- Born: Daegu, South Korea
- Citizenship: USA
- Occupation: Education scholar
- Known for: Equity in STEM education for K-12 students, including English learners
- Spouse: Michael B. Salwen (d. 2007)
- Website: OkheeLee.com

Okhee Lee (born 1959) is the Peter L. Agnew Professor of Education at the Steinhardt School of Culture, Education, and Human Development at New York University. She is a professor of childhood education in the Department of Teaching and Learning.

== Career ==
Okhee Lee is involved in establishing equity and justice in the education of STEM (science, technology, engineering, mathematics) for all K-12 students, including students learning English as an additional language, referred to as English learners by the U.S. Department of Education.

Lee has authored six books and more than 140 refereed journal articles on education research, policy and practice. She is one of the most influential education academics in the US by Ed-Scholar Public Influence Rankings published by Education Week.

Lee holds a PhD from Michigan State University, where in 2022 she received an Honorary Doctor of Humanities degree and delivered a keynote speech at the baccalaureate commencement ceremony. She began her career at the University of Miami in Coral Gables, Florida, and rose to professor in the School of Education. In 2011, Lee joined New York University, where she is the principal investigator of the NYU SAIL Research Lab. Lee has endowed student scholarships in memory of her late husband at New York University, Michigan State University, University of Miami, and the Korean-American Educational Researchers Association.

== Research ==
Lee's SAIL team develops elementary and middle school curriculum materials and teacher professional development resources that support science learning, language learning, computational thinking, and justice-centered STEM learning for all students, including English learners and multilingual learners, with funding from the National Science Foundation (NSF).

Lee’s recent work calls for collaboration among educators, scholars, and policymakers to ensure that English language proficiency standards are used in a conceptually sound and practically feasible manner. The American Educational Research Association (AERA) invited Lee to discuss the significance of her 2019 study “Aligning English Language Proficiency Standards With Content Standards: Shared Opportunity and Responsibility Across English Learner Education and Content Areas” in a published video.

She is credited with aligning English language proficiency standards with content standards in English language arts, mathematics, science, and social studies. This alignment is incorporated by the WIDA English Language Development Standards Framework, 2020 Edition. WIDA 2020 guides language education policy in 35 states, the District of Columbia, three territories, and two educational entities. Lee describes how contemporary science standards, called the Next Generation Science Standards (NGSS), and WIDA 2020 reflect each other.

Her research

1. addresses equity and justice in STEM education that is grounded in contemporary theoretical perspectives;
2. addresses justice-centered STEM education with multilingual learners by integrating multiple STEM subjects, including data science and computer science, to address societal challenges using the case of the COVID-19 pandemic; and
3. connects to education policy and practice at the national level.

Lee’s first 2 decades of research, starting in the early 1990s, established her as a leader in science education and equity. With funding from the NSF and the U.S. Department of Education, her research grew to large-scale intervention studies to promote science learning for English learners across the four largest school districts in Florida.

Lee served as a member of the NGSS writing team and was leader of the NGSS Diversity and Equity Team from 2011 to 2013. At the same time, she was a member of the steering committee for the Understanding Language initiative at Stanford University. The NSF named Lee to its Committee on Equal Opportunities in Science and Engineering (CEOSE) in 2024.

With Helen Quinn and Guadalupe Valdés, Lee produced a study on science and language for English language learners in relation to the NGSS. The AERA invited Lee to discuss the significance of her 2013 study “Science and Language for English Language Learners in Relation to Next Generation Science Standards and With Implications for Common Core State Standards for English Language Arts and Mathematics” co-authored with Quinn and Valdés, in a published video. The New York State Education Department collaborated with Lee, whose work contributed to the NYS P-12 Science Learning Standards adopted in December 2016. Lee and her research team created the “Science Initiative,” a series of webinars and briefs released in 2021 that serve as instructional resources for teachers to promote implementation of the standards and equitable opportunities for English language learners and multilingual learners.

== Selected publications ==
- Lee, O., Haas, A., Schwenger, A., & Grapin, S. E. (in press). Teacher feedback guiding professional development programs: A 2-year field trial integrating science and language with multilingual learners. Journal of Science Teacher Education.
- Lee, O., & Grapin, S. E. (2025). Justice-centered STEM education with multilingual learners to address societal challenges: A conceptual framework. Journal of Research in Science Teaching, 62(5), 1202-1231.
- Lee, O., & Grapin, S. E. (2025). STEM education with a focus on equity and justice: Traditional approaches, contemporary approaches, and proposed future approach. Journal of Research in Science Teaching, 62(10), 2255-2269.
- Lee, O., Haas, A., & Grapin, S. E. (2025). Science education for equity and justice with multilingual learners. National Science Teaching Association.
- Lee, O., & Grapin, S. E. (2024). English language proficiency standards aligned with content standards: How the Next Generation Science Standards and WIDA 2020 reflect each other. Science Education, 108(2), 637-658.
- Lee, O., Grapin, S. E., & Haas, A. (2023). Teacher professional development programs integrating science and language with multilingual learners: A conceptual framework. Science Education, 107(5), 1302-1323.
- Grapin, S. E., & Lee, O. (2022). WIDA English language development standards framework, 2020 edition: Key shifts and emerging tensions. TESOL Quarterly, 56(2), 827-839.
- Lee, O., & Campbell, D. T. (2020). What science and STEM teachers can learn from COVID-19: Harnessing data science and computer science through the convergence of multiple STEM subjects. Journal of Science Teacher Education, 31(8), 932-944.
- Lee, O., & Stephens, A. (2020). English learners in STEM subjects: Contemporary views on STEM subjects and language with English learners. Educational Researcher, 49(6), 426-432.
- Lee, O. (2019). Aligning English language proficiency standards with content standards: Shared opportunity and responsibility across English learner education and content areas. Educational Researcher, 48(8), 534-542.
- Lee, O. (2018). English language proficiency standards aligned with content standards. Educational Researcher, 47(5), 317-327.
- Lee, O. (2017). Common Core State Standards for ELA/literacy and Next Generation Science Standards: Convergences and discrepancies using argument as an example. Educational Researcher, 46(2), 90-102.
- Lee, O., Quinn, H., & Valdés, G. (2013). Science and language for English language learners in relation to Next Generation Science Standards and with implications for Common Core State Standards for English language arts and mathematics. Educational Researcher, 42(4), 223-233.
- Fradd, S. H., & Lee, O. (1999). Teachers’ roles in promoting science inquiry with students from diverse language backgrounds. Educational Researcher, 28(6), 14-20, 42.
- Lee, O., & Fradd, S. H. (1998). Science for all, including students from non-English language backgrounds. Educational Researcher, 27(4), 12-21.

== Honors ==
- Distinguished Contributions to Science Education Through Research Award, National Association for Research in Science Teaching, 2023
- Honorary Doctor of Humanities degree recipient and keynote speaker at baccalaureate commencement ceremony, Michigan State University, 2022
- Member, National Academy of Education, 2022
- Fellow, American Association for the Advancement of Science, 2021
- Exemplary Contributions to Practice-Engaged Research Award, American Educational Research Association, 2021
- Distinguished Service to Science Education Award, National Science Teaching Association, 2020
- Inaugural Distinguished Researcher Award, Korean-American Educational Researchers Association, 2019
- Division K Innovations in Research on Equity and Social Justice in Teacher Education Award, American Educational Research Association, 2019
- Fellow, American Educational Research Association, 2009
- Distinguished Career Contribution Award from the Committee for Scholars of Color in Education, American Educational Research Association, 2003
