= Una Ryan =

British-American biologist

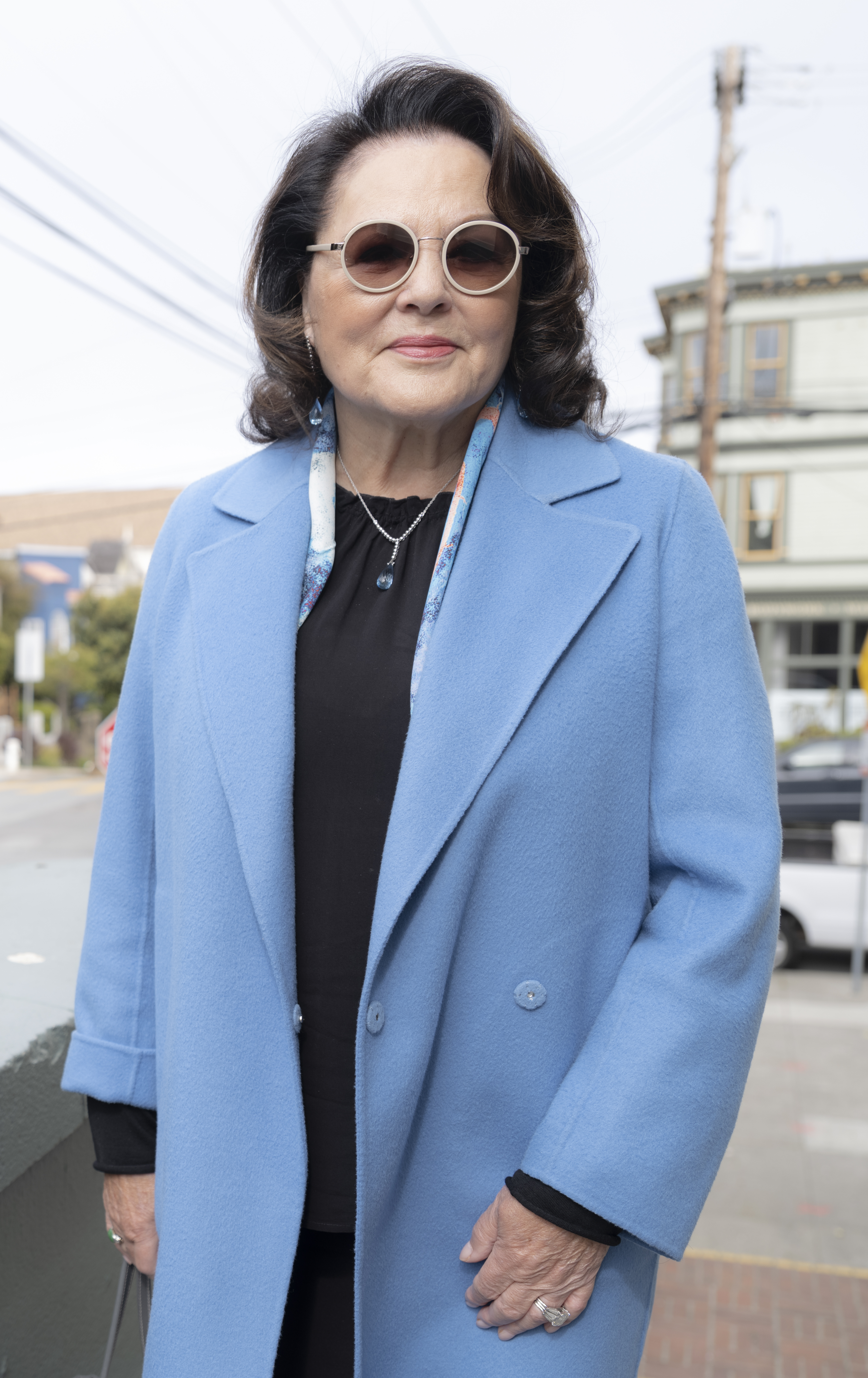
- Dr Una Ryan in 2021
- Born: Una Scully; 18 December 1941 (age 84); Kuala Lumpur, Malaysia
- Other names: Una S. Smith, Una Scully Ryan, Una Callow
- Education: University of Bristol; University of Cambridge
- Occupations: vascular biology, biotechnology angel investing
- Years active: 1964–
- Employer(s): University of Miami; Washington University in St. Louis; Monsanto; Boston University; AVANT Immunotherapeutics Inc; Bay Area BioEconomy Initiative
- Spouse(s): Smith (ca. 1965); Ryan (ca. 1975); Allan Dana Callow (m. May 26, 1989)
- Awards: Order of the British Empire; Albert Einstein Award

Una Ryan (born December 18, 1941) is a British-American biologist who has conducted research on vascular biology, publishing over 300 papers. After an extended research and academic career she began a career in the biotech industry. She was Director for Health Sciences of Monsanto; CEO, president and director of AVANT Immunotherapeutics; and is currently the chairman of The Bay Area BioEconomy Initiative, among many other associations. She is an angel investor and focuses her funds on women-led companies. She has won numerous awards and recognition during her career including the National Institutes of Health's 10-year merit award, Order of the British Empire and the Albert Einstein Award.

== Biography ==
Una Scully was born on December 18, 1941 in Kuala Lumpur, Malaysia to a British father who was interned in a Japanese camp during World War II. Scully and her mother fled by boat from Singapore to England, where she completed her education, graduating with a degree in zoology from the University of Bristol in 1963. In 1965, she began publishing under the name of Una Smith and did so until 1973. She went on to complete a PhD at the University of Cambridge in 1967 and that same year moved to the United States, taking up a Howard Hughes Fellowship at the University of Miami to study angiotensin-converting enzymes. After completion of the fellowship, Smith taught as a professor of life sciences and medicine at the University of Miami School of Medicine from 1972 to 1989. In 1975, her professional publishing reflected her name as U. S. Ryan or Una Scully Ryan. Her work at Miami was recognized by a 10-year Merit Award from the National Institutes of Health.

In 1989, Ryan married the surgeon, Allan Dana Callow and then beginning in 1990, she worked as a Research Professor of Surgery, Medicine and Cell Biology at Washington University School of Medicine in St. Louis, Missouri. Simultaneously, she accepted a position at Monsanto as Director for Health Sciences. She left Monsanto in 1992 and joined AVANT Immunotherapeutics Inc. as a vice-president and chief scientific researcher in May 1993. Around the same time, she left Washington University for a position as a Research Professor of Medicine at Boston University School of Medicine and obtained US citizenship in 1994. In 1996, Ryan was promoted to President at AVANT and also began as chief executive officer and President of Celldex Therapeutics Inc, while continuing to research and publish papers on vaccines against viral and bacterial diseases and for cholesterol management.

Ryan was awarded the Order of the British Empire in 2002 for her contributions to research and development to biotechnology. In 2007, she was honored with the Albert Einstein Award for her development of new vaccines to combat global infectious diseases and then in 2008, she left the for-profit sector leaving her positions at AVANT and Celldex. In 2009 she was awarded an honorary doctorate from the University of Bristol. In addition to vaccines, Ryan has worked on clean water solutions and in 2009 was awarded a Cartier Women's Initiative Awards for a wastewater cleaning program using blue-green algae and solar energy. Unable to secure venture capital funds for the program, Ryan turned her focus toward a program called Diagnostics for All, in an attempt to provide inexpensive diagnostic tests to developing countries. The innovation used paper tests and a drop of blood which when chemicals were applied would change color to indicate different results, without lab work required and simple disposal, as the paper could be burned. The company began with liver testing and then expanded their products to include pregnancy tests and a glucose monitoring test for diabetics.

Deciding to relocate to the American west coast in 2013, Ryan accepted a position as the first woman to chair the Bay Area BioEconomy Initiative. While she was in Boston, Ryan was on the board of the Biotechnology Industry Organization and the BioEconomy Initiative with similar aims of increasing efficiency and decreasing the time it takes for products to begin clinical trials and ultimately get to medical professionals. She also turned her focus to angel investing in an attempt to help women-run businesses find venture capital funds. Ryan was managing director of Golden Seeds, a partner in Astia Angel and participated with The Angel Forum all aimed at investing in startups and mentoring businesses in the Silicon Valley. She is on the boards of several biotechnology firms.

In 2015, Ryan launched ULUX fine art based on her electron micrographs. Ryan has two daughters.

== Selected works ==
- Scully, Una (February 1964). "Factors influencing the secretion of regeneration-promoting hormone in Nereis diversicolor". General and Comparative Endocrinology. 4 (1): 91–98. doi:10.1016/0016-6480(64)90041-3. PMID 14116578.
- Scully, Una (February 1964). "Hormonal control of growth in Nereis diversicolor". General and Comparative Endocrinology. 4 (1): 82–90. doi:10.1016/0016-6480(64)90040-1. PMID 14116577.
- Smith, Una; Smith, David S (September 1965). "A mictotubular complex in the epidermal nucleus of an insect, Carausius morosus". Journal of Cell Biology. 26 (3): 961–967. doi:10.1083/jcb.26.3.961. PMC 2106791. PMID 19866690.
- Smith, Una; Ribbons, Douglas W; Smith, David S (1970). "The fine structure of Methylococcus capsulatus". Tissue and Cell. 2 (4): 513–520. doi:10.1016/s0040-8166(70)80027-1. PMID 18631529.
- Smith, Una; Smith, David S; Ryan, James W (May 1973). "Tubular myelin assembly in type II alveolar cells: Freeze-fracture studies". The Anatomical Record. 176 (1): 125–127. doi:10.1002/ar.1091760110. PMID 4739945. S2CID 31229494.
- Ryan, Una; Ryan, James W; Smith, David S (1975). "Alveolar type II cells: Studies on the mode of release of lamellar bodies". Tissue and Cell. 7 (3): 587–599. doi:10.1016/0040-8166(75)90028-2. PMID 170710.
- Ryan, Una; Ryan, James W (July 1976). "Correlation of pulmonary structure with pharmacokinetic function". Agents and Actions. 6 (4): 510–515. doi:10.1007/bf01973270. PMID 183486. S2CID 2528822.
- Ryan, Una; Ryan, James W (April 1980). "Angiotensin-Converting Enzyme: II. Pulmonary Endothelial Cells in Culture". Environmental Health Perspectives. 35: 171–180. Bibcode:1980EnvHP..35..171R. doi:10.1289/ehp.8035171. PMC 1568453. PMID 6250810.
- Jacobson, Bruce S; Ryan, Una (1982). "Growth of endothelial and HeLa cells on a new multipurpose microcarrier that is positive, negative or collagen coated". Tissue and Cell. 4 (1): 69–83. doi:10.1016/0040-8166(82)90008-8. PMID 7089966.
- Ryan, Una (June 1984). "Isolation and Culture of Pulmonary Endothelial Cells". Environmental Health Perspectives. 56: 103–114. Bibcode:1984EnvHP..56..103R. doi:10.1289/ehp.8456103. PMC 1568192. PMID 6090112.
- Ryan, Una (1986). "Endothelial function". Journal of Critical Care. 1 (2): 101. doi:10.1016/s0883-9441(86)80056-9.
- Ryan, Una (December 1987). "Activation of Endothelial Cells". Annals of the New York Academy of Sciences. 516 (1): 22–38. Bibcode:1987NYASA.516...22R. doi:10.1111/j.1749-6632.1987.tb33027.x. PMID 3326481. S2CID 28646649.
- Ryan, Una S. (1988). Endothelial Cells. Vol. I. Boca Raton, Florida: CRC Press. ISBN 978-0-849-34988-1.
- Ryan, Una S. (1988). Endothelial Cells. Vol. II. Boca Raton, Florida: CRC Press. ISBN 978-0-8493-4991-1.
- Ryan, Una S. (1988). Endothelial Cells. Vol. III. Boca Raton, Florida: CRC Press. ISBN 978-0-849-34992-8.
- Ryan, Una S.; Rubanyi, Gabor M. (November 27, 1991). Endothelial Regulation of Vascular Tone. New York: Taylor & Francis. ISBN 978-0-8247-8578-9.

== Bibliography ==
- Callow, Allan (October 1, 2013). The Man on the Ground: Who Really Wins Our Wars?. Authorsolutions. ISBN 978-1-4834-0376-2.
