= Lester Goran =

American writer

- Born: May 16, 1928; Pittsburgh, Pennsylvania, U.S.
- Died: February 6, 2014 (aged 85)
- Education: Fifth Avenue High School; Schenley High School; University of Pittsburgh (BA, MA)
- Occupation: Writer
- Spouse: Edythe McDowell
- Children: 3
- Parent(s): Jacob Goran; Tillie Goran

Lester Goran (May 16, 1928 – February 6, 2014) was an American writer best known for his works about growing up poor in the Oakland neighborhood of Pittsburgh, Pennsylvania.

== Early life ==
Goran was born May 16, 1928, in Pittsburgh, Pennsylvania. His parents were Jacob and Tillie Goran. Goran was raised in a housing project near the University of Pittsburgh. Although the university was close, Goran grew up among the working class culture of the projects. Although he was Jewish, his writing was heavily influenced by the culture of Irish-Americans and the goings on of the local pubs, especially the Irish Club.

== Education ==
Goran attended Fifth Avenue High School and Schenley High School and the University of Pittsburgh for both his B.A. and M.A. which he earned in 1951 and 1961, respectively. Goran also served with the U.S. Army Corps of Engineers and the Military Police. Goran married Edythe McDowell. The couple had three children.

== Career ==
Goran joined the faculty at the University of Miami in Coral Gables, Florida, in 1960. He became a professor of English in 1974. He founded the Creative Writing Program in the College of Arts and Sciences in 1965. In 1991, he contributed to establishing the University of Miami's Master of Fine Arts program. Over the course of his career as a faculty member at the University of Miami, he taught more than 20,000 students.

Goran's work reflects a great deal about his past and upbringing. In Tales from the Irish Club: A Collection of Short Stories, Goran portrays the neighborhood of his childhood by presenting it through a series of short stories. Much of his work is influenced by Irish-American culture.

The sequel to Tales from the Irish Club was She Loved Me Once, another collection of short stories. Critics welcomed She Loved Me Once as a simple and solid portrayal of Goran's boyhood community.

In his novel, Bing Crosby's Last Song, Goran explores Pittsburgh through the eyes of his main character Daly Racklin. The novel takes place just before the assassination of John F. Kennedy and chronicles Daly's confrontation with heart problems and the prospect of losing his home. Critics, including Library Journal reviewer Susan Gene Clifford, said work was more of a "nostalgic snapshot" as opposed to a true novel. But it was praised by most critics for its down-to-earth style.

== Selected bibliography ==
- The Paratrooper of Mechanic Avenue (1960)
- Maria Light (1962)
- The Candy Butcher's Farewell (1964)
- The Stranger in the Snow (1966)
- The Demon in the Sun Parlor (1968)
- The Keeper of Secrets (1971)
- Mrs. Beautiful (1985)
- The Bright Streets of Surfside: The Memoir of a Friendship with Isaac Bashevis Singer (1994)
- Tales from the Irish Club: A Collection of Short Stories (1996)
- She Loved Me Once, and Other Stories (1997)
- Bing Crosby's Last Song (1998)
- Outlaws of the Purple Cow and Other Stories (1999)
- 'Don't I Know You?', an extract from the as-yet-unpublished novel Unnatural Expectations, in Contrappasso Magazine (Issue 1, 2012)

== Bibliography ==
- Dictionary of Literary Biography, Volume 244: American Short-Story Writers since World War II, Thomson Gale (Detroit, MI), 2001.
- Contemporary Authors Online, Gale, 2008. Reproduced in Biography Resource Center. Farmington Hills, Mich.: Gale, 2008.
