= Kenneth T. Henson =

Retired professor of education and former dean

- Education: University of Florida; University of Alabama Auburn University
- Known for: Dean, College of Education at The Citadel

Kenneth T. Henson is a retired professor of education at The Citadel, The Military College of South Carolina. He was the first dean of the School of Education from 2001 through 2004. He retired in 2012.

Prior to his position at The Citadel he was the dean (1988–1999) and professor (1999–2001) at Eastern Kentucky University. He was also a professor and head of curriculum and instruction at the University of Alabama. He was the first director of the doctoral program at Delta State University. He was also a professor of education at Indiana State University, Texas A & M University, and the University of Miami. He was a Fulbright scholar, 1971–1972. In 2000 he received the Association of Teacher Educators Distinguished Teacher Educator Award. He received the Franklin Silverman Lifetime Achievement Award from the Text and Academic Authors Association in 2008.

== Publications ==
His 61 books include Supervision: A Collaborative Approach to Instructional Improvement; "Curriculum Planning: Integrating Multiculturalism, Constructivism, and Education Reform, fifth edition. Both by Waveland Press; .Teaching Today, 9th ed Pearson (co-authored); and "Writing for Publication, Second Edition, 2015, Amazon"

== Education ==
- Bachelor of Science in education from Auburn University, 1963
- Master of Education from the University of Florida, 1967
- Doctor of Education in Curriculum and Research from the University of Alabama, 1969
