= Roy O. Woodbury =

Roy Orlo Woodbury
- Born: November 28, 1913; Montpelier, North Dakota
- Died: September 21, 2002 (aged 88); Stuart, Florida
- Education: University of Miami
- Spouse: Ruth H. Nearing Woodbury
- Children: 5
- Scientific career
- Thesis: A study of the mosses of Dade County, Florida
- Academic advisors: Walter Buswell.

Roy Orlo Woodbury (November 28, 1913 – September 21, 2002) was an American botanist and researcher.

== Early life ==
Woodbury was born on November 28, 1913, in Montpelier, North Dakota. His early years were spent in a farm in Redland, Florida, where he developed his passion for plant life. In high school, he was the first president of the Future Farmers of America in Florida. In 1937, he received a bachelor's degree in botany from the University of Miami. He obtained his master's degree from Duke University, and a PhD in Plant Ecology from Rutgers University.

== Career ==
Roy Woodbury taught botany at the University of Miami from 1934 to 1955. He was the first faculty member to plant native plants at the Gifford Arboretum, a botanical garden at the university campus.

In 1955, Woodbury accepted a position at the Experimental Agricultural Station at the University of Puerto Rico, to work on tropical plants. Woodbury held various positions from 1955 to 1981, such as plant taxonomist. He would help design the University of Puerto Rico's Botanical Garden. From 1957 to 1973, Woodbury was a lecturing professor at the University of Puerto Rico, Rio Piedras Campus, and from 1973 to 1980 as a regular professor at the same institution, where he played an important role in the development of graduate student research in botany.

Woodbury also worked as a consultant for public agencies as well as private institutions. After his retirement from the University of Puerto Rico in 1980, he continued to work as a consultant at the Puerto Rico Department of Natural Resources on endangered species and co-authored numerous papers on the flora of Puerto Rico.

Woodbury's field work into Puerto Rico's forests provided valuable insight on the identification of new species of plans, as well as re-discovering plants thought to have been extinct. Woodbury is also credited for the discovery of the Malpighia woodburyana, known as cowage cherry; Solanum woodburyi, known as Woodsbury nightshade; Lepanthus woodburyi, a kind of orchid found in the rain forests of Puerto Rico; and Eugenia woodburyana, a flowering plant. Blechnum woodburyi, a species of fern, is also named after Woodbury.

Woodbury published more than 69 publications on the Caribbean flora. Among the publications, he co-authored Trees of Puerto Rico and the Virgin Islands, Common Trees of Puerto Rico and the Virgin Islands, and Flora of Virgin Gorda (1976), with Elbert Luther Little and Frank H. Wadsworth.

Roy Woodbury died on November 21, 2002, in Stuart, Florida after suffering from skin cancer, a condition known to be caused by prolonged exposure to the sun.
