= Lisa Beal =

Oceanographer

- Education: University of Southampton
- Scientific career
- Thesis: Observations of the velocity structure of the Agulhas Current (1997)

Lisa M. Beal is a professor at the University of Miami known for her work on the Agulhas Current. She is the editor-in-chief of the Journal of Geophysical Research: Oceans.

== Education and career ==
Beal grew up in the United Kingdom, and was first attracted to aeronautical engineering as an undergraduate at University of Southampton before changing to oceanography. She earned her Ph.D. from the University of Southampton working on the Agulhas Current. Following her Ph.D. she did postdoctoral work at Columbia University and Scripps Institution of Oceanography before moving to the University of Miami in 2003. In 2021 Beal was named editor-in-chief for the Journal of Geophysical Research: Oceans. She formerly served as editor for the ocean section of Geophysical Research Letters from 2014 until 2017.

== Research ==
Beal is known for her work on the Agulhas current, a western boundary current in the southwest Indian Ocean. She first worked on Agulhas Undercurrent and determined the velocity of the current using acoustic measurements. Her work has defined the role of the Agulhas Current in global climate, particularly through her development of high resolution models She has quantified recent widening of the current and its subsequent impact on transport of heat. Her other work in the area includes investigations into monsoons in the Arabian Sea and monitoring climate change in the Indian Ocean using the Indian Ocean Observing System. In Florida, Beal has used cruise ships such as the Explorer of the Seas to examine water currents in the Florida Straits and worked on sea level rise in the area around Miami.

== Selected publications ==
- Cunningham, Stuart A.; Kanzow, Torsten; Rayner, Darren; Baringer, Molly O.; Johns, William E.; Marotzke, Jochem; Longworth, Hannah R.; Grant, Elizabeth M.; Hirschi, Joël J.-M.; Beal, Lisa M.; Meinen, Christopher S.; Bryden, Harry L. (17 August 2007). "Temporal Variability of the Atlantic Meridional Overturning Circulation at 26.5°N". Science. 317 (5840): 935–938. Bibcode:2007Sci...317..935C. doi:10.1126/science.1141304. PMID 17702940. S2CID 129048818.
- Beal, Lisa M.; De Ruijter, Wilhelmus P. M.; Biastoch, Arne; Zahn, Rainer (April 2011). "On the role of the Agulhas system in ocean circulation and climate". Nature. 472 (7344): 429–436. Bibcode:2011Natur.472..429B. doi:10.1038/nature09983. PMID 21525925. S2CID 4424886.
- Johns, W. E.; Baringer, M. O.; Beal, L. M.; Cunningham, S. A.; Kanzow, T.; Bryden, H. L.; Hirschi, J. J. M.; Marotzke, J.; Meinen, C. S.; Shaw, B.; Curry, R. (15 May 2011). "Continuous, Array-Based Estimates of Atlantic Ocean Heat Transport at 26.5°N". Journal of Climate. 24 (10): 2429–2449. Bibcode:2011JCli...24.2429J. doi:10.1175/2010JCLI3997.1. hdl:11858/00-001M-0000-0012-3173-2. ISSN 0894-8755. S2CID 4824522.
- Beal, Lisa M.; Bryden, Harry L. (15 March 1999). "The velocity and vorticity structure of the Agulhas Current at 32°S". Journal of Geophysical Research: Oceans. 104 (C3): 5151–5176. Bibcode:1999JGR...104.5151B. doi:10.1029/1998jc900056. ISSN 0148-0227.
- Beal, Lisa M.; Ffield, Amy; Gordon, Arnold L. (15 April 2000). "Spreading of Red Sea overflow waters in the Indian Ocean". Journal of Geophysical Research: Oceans. 105 (C4): 8549–8564. Bibcode:2000JGR...105.8549B. doi:10.1029/1999jc900306. ISSN 0148-0227.

== Awards and honors ==
- In 2019, Beal delivered the Marie Tharpe lecture at GEOMAR Helmholtz Centre for Ocean Research Kiel.
