= Maria Light =

1962 novel by Lester Goran

- First edition
- Author: Lester Goran
- Language: English
- Publisher: Houghton Mifflin
- Publication date: 1962
- Publication place: United States
- Media type: Print (hardback)
- Pages: 181
- OCLC: 1313097

Maria Light is a novel by the American writer Lester Goran set in 1940s Pittsburgh, Pennsylvania.

It tells the story of Maria Light, a recent widow in a Pittsburgh government housing project called Addison Terrace as she tries to survive, providing for her three children and her elderly father-in-law.
