= Hermann Beck =

German-American historian

- Born: 1955 (age 70–71)
- Awards: Yad Vashem International Book Prize for Holocaust Research (2024)

Academic background
- Education: University of California, Los Angeles

Academic work
- Discipline: Modern European history, German history, antisemitism
- Institutions: University of Miami

Hermann Beck, (born 30 January 1955) is a German-American historian specializing in modern European and German history. He is Professor of History and a Cooper Fellow at the University of Miami. His research focuses on political, intellectual, and social history, with particular emphasis on German conservatism, antisemitism, and the early history of National Socialism.

== Education and academic career ==
Beck studied ancient and modern history and German Studies (Germanistik) at several German universities (Mannheim, Freiburg, Free University of Berlin), the London School of Economics, the Sorbonne, and the University of California, Los Angeles (UCLA), where he received his Ph.D in European history.

He has held a number of academic fellowships and research appointments as a Fulbright Scholar, a Fellow of the Berliner Historische Kommission, and a member of the Institute for Advanced Study in Princeton.

== Research ==
Beck's scholarship concentrates on modern Europe, in particular on German history with emphasis on political culture, institutional structures and the mindset of the German elites from the nineteenth century through the Nazi period. His work combines approaches in political, social, intellectual, and administrative history and is based on extensive archival research.

=== The Origins of the Authoritarian Welfare State in Prussia ===
His first monograph, The Origins of the Authoritarian Welfare State in Prussia: Conservatives, Bureaucracy, and the Social Question, 1815–1870 (1995), analyzes the ideas, institutions and social policy measures that lay at the root of the Prussian welfare state and focuses on the mindset of Prussian conservatives and officials in their attempt to solve social problems.

=== The Fateful Alliance ===
In The Fateful Alliance: German Conservatives and Nazis in 1933. The Machtergreifung in a New Light (2008), Beck examines the tension-ridden relationship between German conservatism and National Socialism before and during the Nazi seizure of power. He reveals the existence of a strong anti-conservative component in Nazism and disproves the assumption that National Socialism was mainly an extreme manifestation of rightist politics, establishing instead that it was a socio-political hybrid, combining militant rejection of the Left with hostility toward the bourgeoisie.

=== Before the Holocaust ===
Beck's book Before the Holocaust: Antisemitic Violence and the Reaction of German Elites and Institutions during the Nazi Takeover (2022) documents anti-Semitic violence in Germany during the first months of Nazi rule and analyzes the reaction of political parties, churches, bureaucratic institutions and other elites at a time when protest and resistance to Nazi measures was still possible. In 2024, it was awarded the Yad Vashem International Book Prize for Holocaust Research, an international award recognizing outstanding scholarly contributions to Holocaust studies.

== Awards and honors ==
In 2024, Yad Vashem recognized Before the Holocaust with its International Book Prize for Holocaust Research.

== Selected publications ==
=== Books ===
- The Origins of the Authoritarian Welfare State in Prussia: Conservatives, Bureaucracy, and the Social Question, 1815–1870. Ann Arbor: University of Michigan Press, 1995.
- The Fateful Alliance: German Conservatives and Nazis in 1933. The Machtergreifung in a New Light. Oxford and New York: Berghahn Books, 2008.
- Before the Holocaust: Antisemitic Violence and the Reaction of German Elites and Institutions during the Nazi Takeover. Oxford: Oxford University Press, 2022.
- (Co-editor, with Larry E. Jones) From Weimar to Hitler: Studies on the Dissolution of Weimar Democracy and the Establishment of the Third Reich, 1932–34. Oxford and New York: Berghahn Books, 2019.

=== Articles ===
Beck has published articles in peer-reviewed journals including:

- "The Nazi ‘Seizure of Power." In Robert Gellately, ed., The Oxford History of the Third Reich. Oxford: OUP, 2023: 51-81.
- “The Anti-Bourgeois Character of National-Socialism” Journal of Modern History, 88:3 (September 2016): 572-610.
- “Antisemitische Gewalt während der Machtergreifungszeit und die Reaktion der deutschen Gesellschaft.” In Rainer Hering, ed., Die “Reichskristallnacht” in Schleswig-Holstein. Der Novemberpogrom im historischen Kontext. Hamburg University Press: Hamburg, 2016: 141-191.
- “Konflikte zwischen Deutschnationalen und Nationalsozialisten während der Machtergreifungszeit.” Historische Zeitschrift 292:3 (June 2011): 645-681.
- “Between the Dictates of Conscience and Political Expediency: Hitler’s Conservative Alliance Partner and Anti-Semitism during the Nazi Seizure of Power.” Journal of Contemporary History 41:4 (October 2006): 611-641.
- “Josef Maria von Radowitz and the Implications of Nineteenth-Century German Social Thought.” German History 13 (May 1995): 163-182.
- “Die Rolle des Sozialkonservatismus in der preußisch-deutschen Geschichte als Forschungsproblem.” Jahrbuch für die Geschichte Mittel- und Ostdeutschlands 43 (1995): 59-92.
- “Conservatives and the Social Question in Nineteenth-Century Prussia.” In Larry E. Jones and James Retallack, eds., Between Reform, Reaction, and Resistance: Studies in the History of German Conservatism from 1789 to 1945. London and Providence, 1993: 61-95.
- “State and Society in Pre-March Prussia: The Weavers' Uprising, the Bureaucracy, and the Association for the Welfare of Workers.” Central European History 25 (1992): 303-332.
- “The Social Policies of Prussian Officials: The Bureaucracy in a New Light.” Journal of Modern History 64 (June 1992): 263-298.
