= Donna Coker =

Donna Coker is a law professor at the University of Miami School of Law.

She completed her juris doctor at Stanford Law School in 1991 and has previously taught domestic violence law at Stanford Law School and Santa Clara School of Law. She is an expert in domestic violence policy and law and her research concerns various aspects of criminal law, gender, as well as the connection between economic vulnerability and domestic violence.
