= Donald Spivey =

American historian (born 1948)

- Born: July 18, 1948 (age 78); Chicago, Illinois, U.S.
- Education: University of Illinois (BA, MA); University of California, Davis (PhD)
- Occupation: Historian

Donald Spivey (born July 18, 1948) is an American historian and Distinguished Professor at University of Miami.

== Early life and career ==
Spivey was born in Chicago, Illinois, and attended Richard T. Crane High School. He was the president of his class, which was the last winter graduating class at the school in 1967. He graduated as class salutatorian and later enrolled at the University of Illinois of the Big Ten Conference and journeyed to Urbana-Champaign. In 1960s, he devoted himself to academics and a growing activism and was a member of the Black Students Association, Omega Psi Phi fraternity, and the fight to integrate the faculty and staff at the university, the anti-war movement, and the ongoing struggle for civil rights. Spivey holds a B.A. "with distinction in history" (1971) and a M.A. in history (1972) both from the University of Illinois at Urbana-Champaign.

In 1976, he finished his PhD in history from the University of California, Davis where he studied under the tutelage of labor historian David Brody. Donald Spivey has taught at the University of California, Davis, Wright State University, the University of Michigan, and the University of Connecticut, where he was founding director of the Institute for African-American Studies.

In 1993, he joined University of Miami serving as chair of the department for five years. He is a frequent lecturer and commentator on TV, radio and in the print medium. See, for example, his lecture on "Satchel Paige and Negro Leagues Baseball in the Civil Rights Movement" broadcast on C-SPAN and his presentation on "The Historical Richness of Black Baseball in the New Negro Movement, 1919-1941", at the National Endowment for the Humanities, Washington University Humanities Center Summer Institute.

== Bibliography ==
- Racism, Activism, and Integrity in College Football: The Bates Must Play Movement (2021)
- Ancestry (2018)
- Black Pearls of Wisdom: Voicing the African-American Journey for Freedom, Empowerment, and the Future (2014)
- Step Forward the Hero: The Story of Milton L. Olive, III, First African American Awarded the Medal of Honor in the Vietnam War (2014)
- "If You Were Only White": The Life of Leroy “Satchel” Paige (2012)
- Fire From The Soul: A History of the African-American Struggle (2003)
- The Politics of Miseducation: The Booker Washington Institute of Liberia, 1929-1984 (1986)
- Sport in America: New Historical Perspectives (1985)
- Union and the Black Musician: The Narrative of William Everett Samuels and Chicago Local 208 (1984)
- Schooling For The New Slavery: Black Industrial Education, 1868-1915 (1978; paperback edition, 2007)

== Honors and awards ==
- Faculty Senate Outstanding Teaching Award
- Provost's Award for Scholarly Activity
- Robert Peterson Recognition Award
- Ronald McDonald House Award
