= Jay Skyler =

Jay S. Skyler is a professor of medicine, Pediatrics and Psychology at the University of Miami Miller School of Medicine.

A graduate of Pennsylvania State University and Jefferson Medical College, he did his postgraduate training in Internal Medicine and in Endocrinology and Metabolism at Duke University Medical Center.

He was founding editor-in-chief of Diabetes Care from 1978 to 1982, and editor-in-chief of Diabetes Reviews during 1998 and 1999.

He has an h-index of 82 according to Google Scholar.
