= Roberto C. Heros =

Roberto C. Heros is an American physician who is professor and co-chairman of the Department of Neurological Surgery at the University of Miami. Heros specializes in cerebrovascular surgery and is a founder of the University of Miami International Health Center. He has received the American Association of Neurological Surgeons' highest honor, the Cushing Medal. Heros was also a POW in the Bay of Pigs, where he participated as a paratrooper for the United States. He was released after two years in Cuban prison, and then completed his medical school at the University of Tennessee and his residency at the Massachusetts General Hospital, where he eventually served as the director of cerebrovascular surgery. Heros has since published over 100 journal articles and several books on neurosurgery, and currently serves as an editor for the Journal of Neurosurgery and Neurosurgery.
