= Stanley Langbein =

American lawyer, academic

Stanley l. Langbein
- Occupations: Lawyer, academic, and author

Academic background
- Education: A.B., Yale College; J.D., Harvard Law School

Academic work
- Institutions: University of Miami

Stanley I. Langbein is an American lawyer, academic, and author. He is a professor of law at the University of Miami, where he teaches administrative law, federal and international taxation, banking law, and commercial law.

Langbein practiced law in Washington, D.C. for over a decade and previously served as a Treasury official and as a Law Clerk for the Fifth Circuit Court of Appeals. He is the author of four books, including Federal Income Taxation of Banks and Financial Institutions and Financial Institution Acquisitions and Alliances. Additionally, he has made expert appearances in cases such as Scadif v. First Union National Bank (2003), Daikin AC v. Eastern National Bank (2010), BankUnited v. United States (2024), and Wal-Mart Puerto Rico v. Zaragoza-Gomez (2016).

== Education ==
Langbein earned his B.A. in English from Yale College in 1970. He went on to receive his Juris Doctor from Harvard Law School in 1973.\

== Career ==
Langbein began his legal career in 1973 as a law clerk for John Minor Wisdom of the U.S. Court of Appeals for the Fifth Circuit. From 1974 to 1985, he worked as an Associate Attorney at Shea & Gardner, Cohen & Uretz, and Williams & Connolly. From 1985 to 1987, he worked at Saperston & Day. Since 1987, he has been a professor of law at the University of Miami, where he teaches international and corporate taxation, banking law, administrative law, and commercial law.

== Works ==
Langbein's research has focused on taxation, with a particular emphasis on U.S. tax treaty policy. In his early work, he co-authored the article "United States Tax Treaty Policy: An Overview," in which he discussed the primary objective of U.S. tax treaties—eliminating double taxation and promoting international trade.

In the mid-1980s, Langbein published an article, entitled "The Unitary Method and the Myth of Arm's Length," which questioned conventional wisdom concerning the manner in which corporate profits are allocated for tax purposes among various countries in which multinational enterprises operate. The established method for doing this allocation was the "arm's length" method, which determined the allocation based on the hypothetical transfer prices the different national components of the enterprise would charge each other at "arm's length." This article questioned the extent to which this method historically constituted the antithesis of alternative methods of allocation based on productive factors located in the various jurisdictions involved. The article identified ways in which the arm's length method is theoretically defective and facilitates tax evasion and avoidance by multinational enterprises.

When it enacted the major 1986 tax reform, Congress mandated a comprehensive study of transfer pricing by the Treasury Department. The department completed this study in 1988, and its chapter on the theory of transfer pricing relied on Langbein's article, particularly its emphasis on the "continuum price problem" generated by the arm's length standard. Langbein responded to the publication of this White Paper in several articles, including a proposal for reform presented at the University of Michigan's annual tax policy conference in 1991.

The United States amended its regulations governing transfer pricing in 1993 and 1994 and worked with the Organization for Economic Co-operation and Development (OECD) in developing international guidelines reflecting the approach embodied in the revised United States regulations. Bill Clinton, during his 1992 election campaign, had advocated reforms along the lines suggested by Langbein. After taking office, the then-President supported watered-down proposals, which embodied substantial concessions to the OECD.

From 2010 to 2012, reports exposed flaws in 1990s transfer pricing rules, showing many corporations paid minimal taxes. This led to congressional hearings and the adoption of the G20 and OECD's base erosion and profit shifting (BEPS) initiative to reform transfer pricing and the international tax system. In response to the completion of the first phase of this BEPS project, Langbein in 2018, along with German scholar Max Fuss, published a study approving of the reform effort but critical of its limitations at that stage.

The BEPS initiative entered a second phase, with the adoption in 2021 of the two-pillar approach to international tax reform.

In 2001, Langbein authored a book Federal Income Taxation of Banks and Financial Institutions, where he addressed tax challenges for financial institutions, including the Alternative Minimum Tax, currency transactions, interest expenses, and compliance issues. In a collaborative 2018 study with Max R. Fuss, he highlighted how the 1990s tax regime allowed "stateless" income, limiting corporate profit taxation, and how the BEPS initiative aimed to address this, though its rules remained complex and needed refinement. Extending this focus, he demonstrated that the Tax Cut and Jobs Act shifted the U.S. from a global tax system to a modified territorial system, with a focus on how income was allocated across jurisdictions, particularly regarding international intangible income.

Langbein also explored whether congressional actions during the thrift crisis, particularly supervisory goodwill, constituted a "taking" under the Takings Clause, concluding that the Supreme Court's Winstar decision suggested significant government actions affecting private rights in regulated industries may require compensation.

== Bibliography ==
=== Books ===
- Taxation and Regulation of Bank and Thrift Acquisitions (1993) ISBN 978-0-07-172152-3
- The Bank Income Tax Return Manual (2000) ISSN 0734-8037
- Federal Income Taxation of Banks and Financial Institutions (2001) ISBN 978-0-7913-4467-5
- Financial Institution Acquisitions and Alliances (2001) ISBN 978-1-58852-097-5

=== Selected articles ===
- Langbein, S. I. (2013). PPL, the Foreign Tax Credit, and the Gitlitz “Finger” Principle. Tax Manag. Int. J., 42(10), 599.
- Langbein, S. I. (2013). Doing the Math (and the English) in the Windfall Tax Cases. Tax Manag. Int. J., 42(3), 134.
- Langbein, S. I., & Fuss, M. R. (2018). The OECD/G20-BEPS-Project and the Value Creation Paradigm: Economic Reality Disemboguing into the Interpretation of the Arm's Length Standard. Int'l Law., 51, 259.
- Langbein, S. I. (2019). United States Policy and the Taxation of International Intangible Income. U. Miami Inter-Am. L. Rev., 50, 1.
- Lagbein, S. I. (2020). The Deductibility of PPP-Reimbursed Expenses. Tax notes (Arlington), 169(11), 1747.
