= Edmund Abaka =

Photographer and historian of Africa

- Alma mater: University of Cape Coast; University of Guelph; York University
- Occupation: Photographer, editor, writer
- Employer: University of Miami
- Awards: Fulbright Program
- Position held: associate professor

Edmund Abaka is a Ghanaian-born American photographer and historian of Africa at the University of Miami in Coral Gables, Florida.

Abaka is a Fulbright scholar.

== Early life and education ==
Abaka was born in Ghana and pursued his undergraduate studies at the University of Cape Coast. He later moved to Canada for graduate education, completing a master’s degree and subsequently earning his Ph.D. in African history at York University in 1998. His doctoral research centered on African economic history, particularly the trade in kola nuts in Asante and the Gold Coast.

== Research ==
Abaka’s early research focused on commodity history, especially the kola nut industry of West Africa, where he examined its agricultural production, trade networks, and significance in the Gold Coast economy from the nineteenth to mid-twentieth century.

His later scholarship has increasingly turned toward the study of slavery and memory, with a particular emphasis on the architecture and lived experiences tied to forts, castles, and dungeons along the Atlantic coast.

He has highlighted the role of “castle slaves” enslaved Africans forced to work within these structures—whose stories remain less documented in historical records.

== Selected publications ==
- "Kola is God's Gift": Agricultural Production, Export Initiatives and the Kola Industry of Asante and the Gold Coast, c. 1820–1950. Ohio University Press, Athens, 2005. (Western African Studies)
- Culture And Customs of Ethiopia. 2007
- House of Slaves and "Door of No Return": Gold Coast/Ghana Slave Forts, Castles & Dungeons and the Atlantic Slave Trade. University of Wisconsin Press
- W. E. B. Du Bois on Africa (edited with Eugene F. Provenzo)
