= Bonnie Seeman =

American artist

- Born: 1969 (age 55–56); Huntington, New York, U.S.
- Known for: ceramicist
- Website: bonnieseeman.com

Coffeepot and Tray porcelain by Bonnie Seeman, 2003, on display at the Metropolitan Museum of Art

Bonnie Seeman (born 1969 in Huntington, New York) is known for her ceramic work.

== Early life and education ==
She received a BFA in ceramics in 1991 from the University of Miami and an MFA in ceramics in 1996 from the University of Massachusetts Dartmouth.

== Career ==
In 2006, her work was included in the exhibit One of a Kind: The Studio Craft Movement at the Metropolitan Museum of Art in New York City. Her work, Teapot with One Cup, was acquired by the Smithsonian American Art Museum in Washington, D.C. as part of the Renwick Gallery's 50th Anniversary Campaign.
