= Claire Paris =

Oceanographer and freediver

- Born: 1958/09/21; Carcassonne, France
- Education: State University of New York at Stony Brook
- Awards: American Geophysical Union Rachel Carson Lecture
- Scientific career
- Workplaces: University of Miami, Rosenstiel School of Marine, Atmospheric and Earth Science
- Thesis: Transport dynamics and survival of the pelagic larval stages of a coral reef fish, the bicolor damselfish, Stegastes partitus (Poey) (2001)

Claire Beatrix Paris-Limouzy, also known as Claire Paris, is marine scientist known for her research on fish larvae and tracking particles in the ocean. She also holds United States National records and World records in freediving.

== Education and career ==
Paris grew up in Carcassonne, France and had an early interests in snorkeling, surfing, and sailing. She has a master's degree in biochemistry from the University of Bordeaux. She earned her Ph.D. in 2001 from the State University of New York at Stony Brook where she worked on damselfish. In 2008 she moved to the University of Miami where she was promoted to professor in 2017.

From 2021 until 2022, Paris is leading the early life history section of the American Fisheries Society

== Research ==
Paris is known for her research on larval migration and connections between populations of larval fish. She has tracked the movement of larval fish in currents around coral reefs, determined how coral reef fish larvae are able to retain their position on a reef, and quantified the export of larval fish from marine reserves. Her research has determined the effects of sound on larval fish, discovered that fish larvae make sounds and that fish larvae are attracted by the chemical compound dimethyl sulfide. Her research uses Lagrangian instruments to observe larvae in the water and she has developed a modelling system to track particles in the ocean. She takes advantage of her freediving to conduct experiments without disturbing fish and to place instruments deep in the water. The sounds recorded with these instruments can be used for science and in art installations. Following the Deepwater Horizon oil spill, Paris developed a model that predicted that the oil would form a plume and move southwest for the site where it was exiting the seafloor. She also examined organic aerosols downwind of the oil spill and the exposure of fish larvae to oil.

== Selected publications ==
- Cowen, R. K.; Paris, C. B.; Srinivasan, A. (2006-01-27). "Scaling of Connectivity in Marine Populations". Science. 311 (5760): 522–527. Bibcode:2006Sci...311..522C. doi:10.1126/science.1122039. PMID 16357224. S2CID 17041077.
- Paris, Claire B.; Cowen, Robert K. (2004). "Direct evidence of a biophysical retention mechanism for coral reef fish larvae". Limnology and Oceanography. 49 (6): 1964–1979. Bibcode:2004LimOc..49.1964P. doi:10.4319/lo.2004.49.6.1964. ISSN 1939-5590. S2CID 207307.
- Paris, CB; Chérubin, LM; Cowen, RK (2007-10-11). "Surfing, spinning, or diving from reef to reef: effects on population connectivity". Marine Ecology Progress Series. 347: 285–300. Bibcode:2007MEPS..347..285P. doi:10.3354/meps06985. ISSN 0171-8630.
- Deep oil spills: facts, fate, and effects. Steven A. Murawski, Cameron H. Ainsworth, Sherryl Gilbert, David J. Hollander, Claire B. Paris, Michael Schlüter. Cham: Springer. 2020. ISBN 978-3-030-11605-7. OCLC 1107585543.
- Murawski, Steven A. (2020). Scenarios and responses to future deep oil spills: fighting the next war. Cameron H. Ainsworth, Sherryl Gilbert, David J. Hollander, Claire B Paris, Michael Schlüter, Dana L Wetzel. Cham SZ. ISBN 978-3-030-12963-7. OCLC 1108571725.

== Freediving ==
Paris is a record-holding competitive freediver, a hobby she began in 2013 after a research project in Belize. She placed fourth in her first competition and has improved to the point of holding United States' national records in freediving events. As of 2021, she is on the United States' national freediving team. In 2015, she set her first national record in the women's dynamic no-fins event (DNF) when she swam 128 meters on one breath. In 2018, she set the national record in dynamic apnea with fins (DYN) with a swim of 184 meters on a single breath, which she surpassed in 2019 with a distance of 197 meters. Paris developed a class at the University of Miami on Scientific Freediving which was the first of its kind at the university.

== Awards and honors ==
In 2018, Paris was awarded the Rachel Carson lecture by the American Geophysical Union.
