= William Eamon =

American historian

William Eamon (born June 5, 1946) is a distinguished Achievement Professor, Regents Professor of History, and Dean of the Honors College at New Mexico State University. He is a specialist in the history of science and has published on various aspects of medieval and early modern science, medicine, and technology. His research focuses primarily on the history of science and medicine in early modern Italy and Spain. His most influential work is on the history of the "books of secrets" tradition in medieval and early modern culture.

His work has also looked at the history of magic and the occult sciences, the history of alchemy, and science and popular culture in early modern Europe. As an author, he has been largely collected by libraries.

== Biography ==
He studied history at the University of Montana, where he received his BA (1968) and MA (1970). He completed his PhD in the history of science from the University of Kansas (1977), where he studied with the distinguished medievalist and historian of botany Jerry Stannard. After a year as a visiting assistant professor at the University of Miami, he joined the Department of History at New Mexico State University in 1976 and served as the department chair for three years. He became director of the University Honors Program in 1995 and led the creation of the Honors College at New Mexico State University, where he currently serves as Dean.

Eamon was a Fulbright Fellow in Germany, a Villa I Tatti Fellow at the Harvard University Center for Italian Renaissance Studies (Florence), and a Postdoctoral fellow at the Institute for Research in the Humanities at the University of Wisconsin. He has been a visiting professor at the University of Wurzburg (Germany) and the University of Valencia.

== Professional Experience ==
2005 Dean, Honors College, New Mexico State University
2012 Distinguished Achievement Professor, New Mexico State University
2004 Regents Professor, New Mexico State University
2004 Visiting professor, University of Valencia (Spain)
1994 Professor of History, New Mexico State University
1994-95 Villa I Tatti Fellow, Harvard University Center for Italian Renaissance Studies, Florence, Italy
1991-95 Head, Department of History, New Mexico State University
1986-87 Guest Professor, Institute for the History of Medicine, University of Würzburg, Germany
1985-86 Fellow, Institute for Research in the Humanities, University of Wisconsin
1981-82 Andrew W. Mellon Faculty Fellow, History of Science, Harvard University
1976-81 Assistant Professor of History, New Mexico State University

== Honors and awards ==
2004 S.P. and Margaret Manasse Research Chair, New Mexico State University.

== Selected publications ==
- The Professor of Secrets: Mystery, Medicine, and Alchemy in Renaissance Italy (Washington: 2010)
- Beyond the Black Legend: Spain and the Scientific Revolution / Mas allá de la Leyenda Negra: España y la Revolución Científica, ed. Victor Navarro Brotòns and William Eamon (Valencia: 2007)
- Science and the Secrets of Nature: Books of Secrets in Medieval and Early Modern Culture (Princeton: 1994). Nominated for Pulitzer Prize; winner of the Association of American Publishers's History Book Award
- La Scienza e i segreti della natura: I ‘libri di segreti’ nella cultura medievale e moderna (Italian translation of Science and the Secrets of Nature; Genova: 1999)
- Co-editor, Culturhistorische Caleidoscoop (Gent: 1992)
