= Edgardo Rotman =

Edgardo Rotman is an international lecturer and author. He has done research and taught at the University of Buenos Aires, the University of El Salvador (in Buenos Aires), Boston University, the University of Miami, the Max-Planck Institute for Criminal Law in Germany, and Harvard Law. He represents the United States at the International Penal and Penitentiary Foundation, where he has been a voting member of the Council since 1996.
