= Nilda (Nena) Peragallo =

American academic

Nilda (Nena) Peragallo Montano is the Dean and Professor of the University of North Carolina School of Nursing in Chapel Hill, North Carolina. She specializes in Women’s and Public Health a special focus on HIV/AIDS prevention in Latino Women.

== Education ==
BS, Nursing, University of Chile, 1974.

MS, Nursing, West Virginia University, 1979.

Dr. PH, Public Health, University of Texas, 1984.

== Recent publications ==
Acosta, E., & Peragallo, N. P. (2001). Looking forward, looking back: A qualitative analysis of a focus group of HIV positive Latinas. Revista Interamericana de Psicología/Interamericano Journal of Psychology, 35(2), 167–181

Cianelli, R., Ferrer, L., & Peragallo, N. P. (2003). A concept analysis of empowerment: Its relationship to HIV/AIDS prevention in Latino women. Hispanic Health Care International, 2(1), 6–12

Ferrer, L. M., Cianelli, R., Peragallo, N. P., & Cabieses, B. (2004). Violencia doméstica y su relación con depresión y autoestima en mujeres mexicanas y puertorriqueñas en Estados Unidos. Horizonte de enfermería, 15, 11–22

Kim, Y. J., Peragallo, N. P., & DeForge, B. (2006). Predictors of program participation in an HIV risk reduction intervention for low-income Latino women. International Journal of Nursing Studies, 527–534

Lee, S., Kim, Y. J., & Peragallo, N. P. (2003). Missing data in nursing research: Review of issues and treatment strategies. Hispanic Health Care International, 2(1), 31–38

Peragallo, N. P., DeForge, B., O’Campo, P., & Lee, S. (2002). SEPA: HIV risk reduction intervention for US Latinas. Abstract of the XIV International AIDS Conference, Barcelona, Spain, 159

Peragallo, N. P., DeForge, B., O’Campo, P., Lee, S., & Kim, Y. J. (2002). Developing a culturally sensitive HIV risk reduction intervention in Latinas. Abstract of 13TH International nursing Research Congress of Sigma Theta Tau International Honor Society of Nursing, Queensland, Australia, 223

Peragallo, N. P., DeForge, B., O’Campo, P., Lee, S., Kim, Y. J., Cianelli, R., & Ferrer, L. (2005). A randomized clinical trial of an HIV risk reduction intervention among low-income Latina women. Nursing Research, 54(2), 108–118

Peragallo, N. P., DeForge, B., Rivero, R., Khoury, Z., & Talashek, M. (2002). Latinas’ perspective on HIV/AIDS: Cultural issues to consider in prevention. Hispanic Health Care International, 1(1), 11-23

Peragallo, N. P., Fox, P.G., & Alba, M. (2000). Acculturation and self-breast examination among immigrant Latino women in the United States. International Nursing Review, 47(1), 38–45

Peragallo, N. P. & Gonzalez, R. (in press). Nursing research and the prevention of infectious disease among vulnerable populations. In D. Konniak-Griffin (Ed), Annual Review of Nursing Research

== Major accomplishments ==
America Red Cross Spectrum Award Honoree, 2007

Named Ambassador in the Paul G. Rogers Society for Global Health Research at Research, America, 2006

Named "Health Care Hero" by Greater Miami Chamber of Commerce, (2006, March)

Hispanic Magazine Top Latinas for 2004, Recognized as One of the Nation's Most Successful Latinas in 2004

Hispanic Health Leadership Award, National Hispanic Medical Association's Eighth Annual Conference, "Hispanic Health Strategies, 2004

Visiting Professor, School of Nursing, Pontificia Universidad Católica de Chile, (2003–present)

Visiting Scholar, University of North Carolina–Chapel Hill, School of Nursing, (2003, January)

Selected as a Fellow for the American Association of Colleges of Nursing (AACN) Leadership for Academic Nursing Program, 2002

Ildaura Murillo – Rhode Excellence in Education Award, National Association of Hispanic Nurses, 2001

Sigma Theta Tau International Nursing Honor Society, 1986

== Sources ==
- UNC leadership page
