= Aquiles Este =

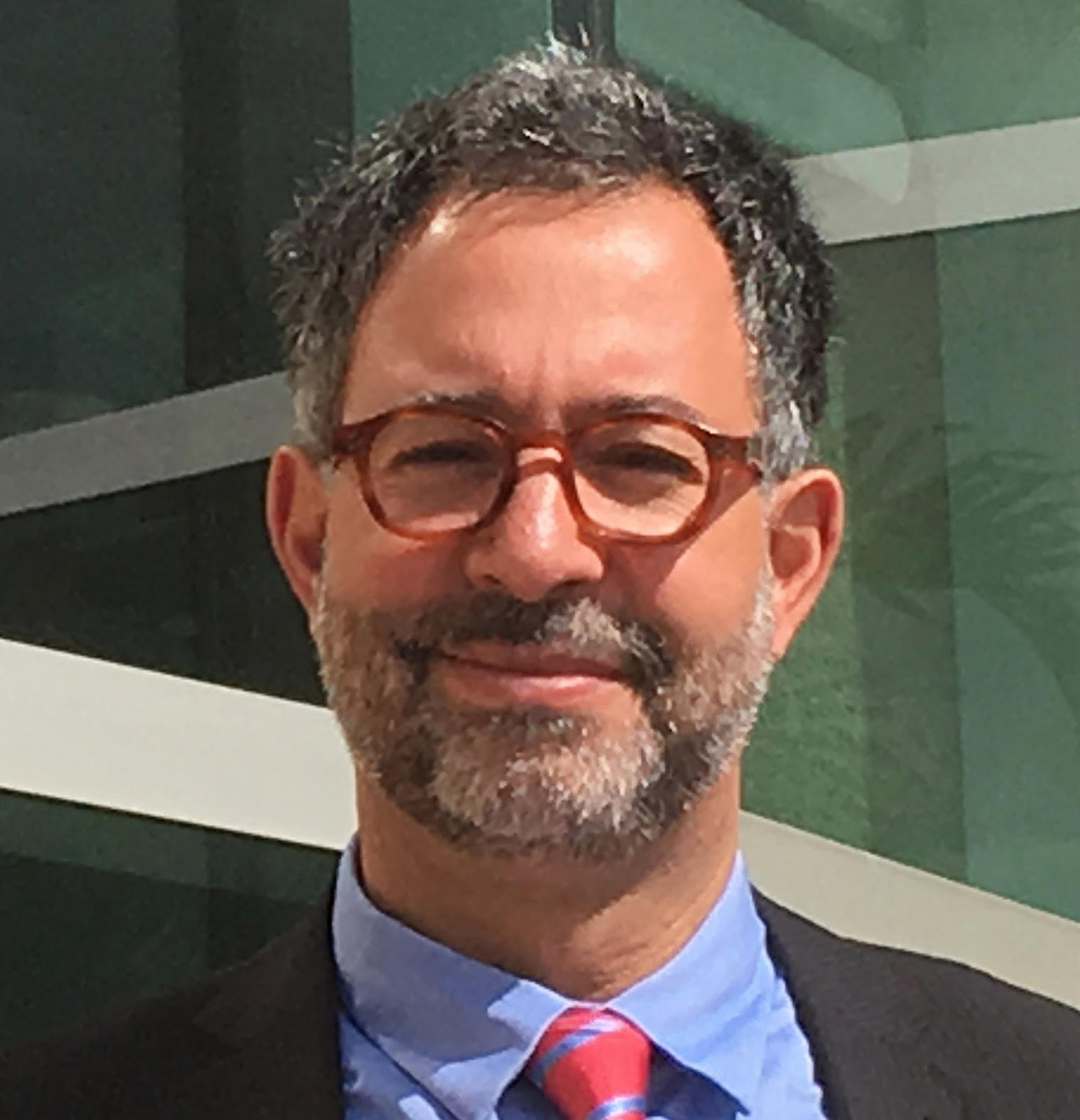
- Born: Caracas, Venezuela
- Citizenship: American
- Occupation: Semiotician

Academic background
- Education: Universidade Católica de São Paulo
- Influences: Ray C. Dougherty; Neil Postman

Academic work
- Discipline: Semiotics
- Institutions: Miami Herbert Business School at the University of Miami
- Main interests: Memetics, public opinion analysis, and cultural replication

Aquiles Este (born c. 1962 in Caracas, Venezuela) is an American semiotician and professor at the University of Miami's School of Business. His research focuses on content management and social media.

== Early life and education ==
Este was born in Caracas, Venezuela. He completed studies in journalism at the Universidad Central de Venezuela in Caracas, and then enrolled at the University of São Paulo and Universidade Católica de São Paulo in São Paulo, Brazil, where he graduated summa cum laude with a doctorate degree in semiotics and communication science.

== Career ==
Este was creative vice president for Lowe & Partners, an international advertising agency, precursor of MullenLowe U.S. He also worked as a dean at ProDiseño, a design school in Caracas and taught at the Instituto de Estudios Superiores de Administración (IESA), a business school in Venezuela.

He has also worked on computational linguistics with New York University linguist Ray C. Dougherty. There, he conducted a research project as a visiting scholar at NYU's Department of Media, Culture, and Communication called "interrelation of Charles S. Peirce's concept of sign replication and Marshall McLuhan's media theories." The project was carried out under the guidance of rhetorician Neil Postman.

In 2016, Este coined the term polimercial brands, referring to commercial products and services that need to position themselves on social and political issues, anticipating that in the near future, all commercial brands will be polimercial.

=== University of Miami School of Business ===
In 2009, he emigrated to the United States as a skilled immigrant. In the U.S., he later took up a professorship at the University of Miami School of Business.

Este is also a political consultant, having led political campaigns at the state, legislative and presidential levels in the Americas.

Este is also a contributor to newspapers such as The New York Times.

== Personal life ==
Este currently lives in Miami. He is a classical guitar player who studied under Uruguayan maestro Abel Carlevaro and Brazilian composer Cristina Azuma.

== Publications ==
Bibliography of publications:

- 1987. Ideas for an Epistemology of Communication. Universidad Central de Venezuela Press, Caracas, Venezuela.
- 1996. Replicant Culture: The New Semiocentric Order Gedisa. Barcelona, Spain. ISBN 9788474326444
- 1997. Graphic Design in Venezuela: An Anthology. Centro La Estancia, Caracas, Venezuela.
- 2003. Einstein: The King of the Absent-minded. Cyls Editores, Barcelona, Spain. ISBN 9789806573024
- November 2001. "The Revenge of the Nerds." Counterblast Journal of Culture and Communication. New York: Peirce, McLuhan and Company.
- December 2005. TV, our daily bread: Post-TV and hypermedia. Alfa Eds, Caracas, Venezuela.
- November 2008. Dilemmas of the Present. Mondadori Eds, Bogota, Colombia.
