= Michael Carlebach =

American photographer and historian

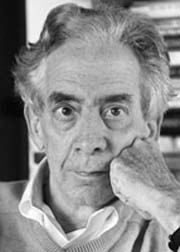
Carlebach in 2010

Michael L. Carlebach is an American photographer and historian known for his books on the subject of early American photojournalism; American Photojournalism Comes of Age and The Origins of Photojournalism in America, as well as his photographs of south Florida and the US. He was staff photographer for The Miami Herald for a brief time and taught at the University of Miami from 1978 to 2005.

== Education ==
Carlebach received his B.A. from Colgate University in French and Political Science in 1967. In 1980, he received his M.A. in American Studies from Florida State University, following that with a second M.A. in 1984 and a PhD in 1988 in American Civilization from Brown University.

== Career ==
Carlebach lived and photographed in South Florida for over three and a half decades, during which time he worked as a photojournalist for the Miami Herald and a staff photographer for The Village Post in Coconut Grove, Florida. and as an unpaid photographer for Miami Children's Hospital’s Ventilation Assisted Children's Center sleepaway camp. When on the faculty at the University of Miami, he directed the American Studies program and chaired the Department of Art and Art History. For his contributions, he won the Wilson Hicks Conference Award, the Freshman Teaching Award, an Excellence in Teaching Award, and a Provost's Award for Scholarly Activity.

In 2011, Carlebach donated images from his personal archives to the University of Miami Libraries’ Special Collections. The Michael L. Carlebach Photography Collection includes photographs from the George McGovern 1972 presidential campaign and Haitian immigrants held at the Krome Avenue Detention Center in south Florida, among many others, and "consists of over 5,000 silver prints, color slides, and publications."

== Personal life ==
He lives with his wife, Margot Ammidown, in Asheville, North Carolina.

== Exhibitions ==
Carlebach's work has appeared in group and solo exhibitions around the United States and abroad, including "Landscapes 2017" at The Center for Fine Art Photography in Fort Collins, CO selected by Lisa Volpe (2017), "Scope 2016: the southern landscape" at VAE in Raleigh, NC (2016), "The Mythology of Florida" at the Ogden Museum of Southern Art in New Orleans, LA (2013), the solo exhibition "American Studies" at the Center for the Study of the American South in Chapel Hill, NC (2011), "Sharp Focus: Black and White Photographic Prints from the Michael L. Carlebach Collection” at the University of Miami (2011), "This Way to the Crypt, II," Piedmont Arts, Martinsville, VA (2001), "This Way to the Crypt," one person show, Frances Wolfson Art Gallery, Miami-Dade Community College (1997), "Forced Out," (the plight of refugees) Los Angeles Municipal Art Museum (1989), World Exhibition of Photography, Berlin, West Germany (1974).

== Published works ==
Carlebach is the author of nine books and has contributed to Tropic Magazine, Time, People, American Heritage, Miami New Times, the Fort Lauderdale Sun-Sentinel, The New York Times, and the London Sunday Times, among others.

- Paris Daly, NP, 1975
- The Origins of Photojournalism in America, Smithsonian Institution Press, 1992
- Farm Security Administration Photographs of Florida (with Eugene F. Provenzo), University Press of Florida, 1993
- American Photojournalism Comes of Age, Smithsonian Institution Press, 1997
- This Way to the Crypt: American Studies, Southeast Museum of Photography, 1998
- Working Stiffs. Occupational Tintypes in the Age of Tintypes, Smithsonian Institution Press, 2002
- Sunny Land: Pictures from Paradise Safe Harbor Books, 2011, with Introduction by Meg Laughlin
- Bain's New York. The City in News Pictures, 1900-1925, Dover Publications, 2012
- Sunny Land: Pictures From Paradise (e-book), MAPP Editions, 2014
- Some of Us, Safe Harbor Books, with original poem by Ann Lauterbach and essay by Nathaniel Tripp, 2017
