= Borko Furht =

American academic in the field of computer science and engineering

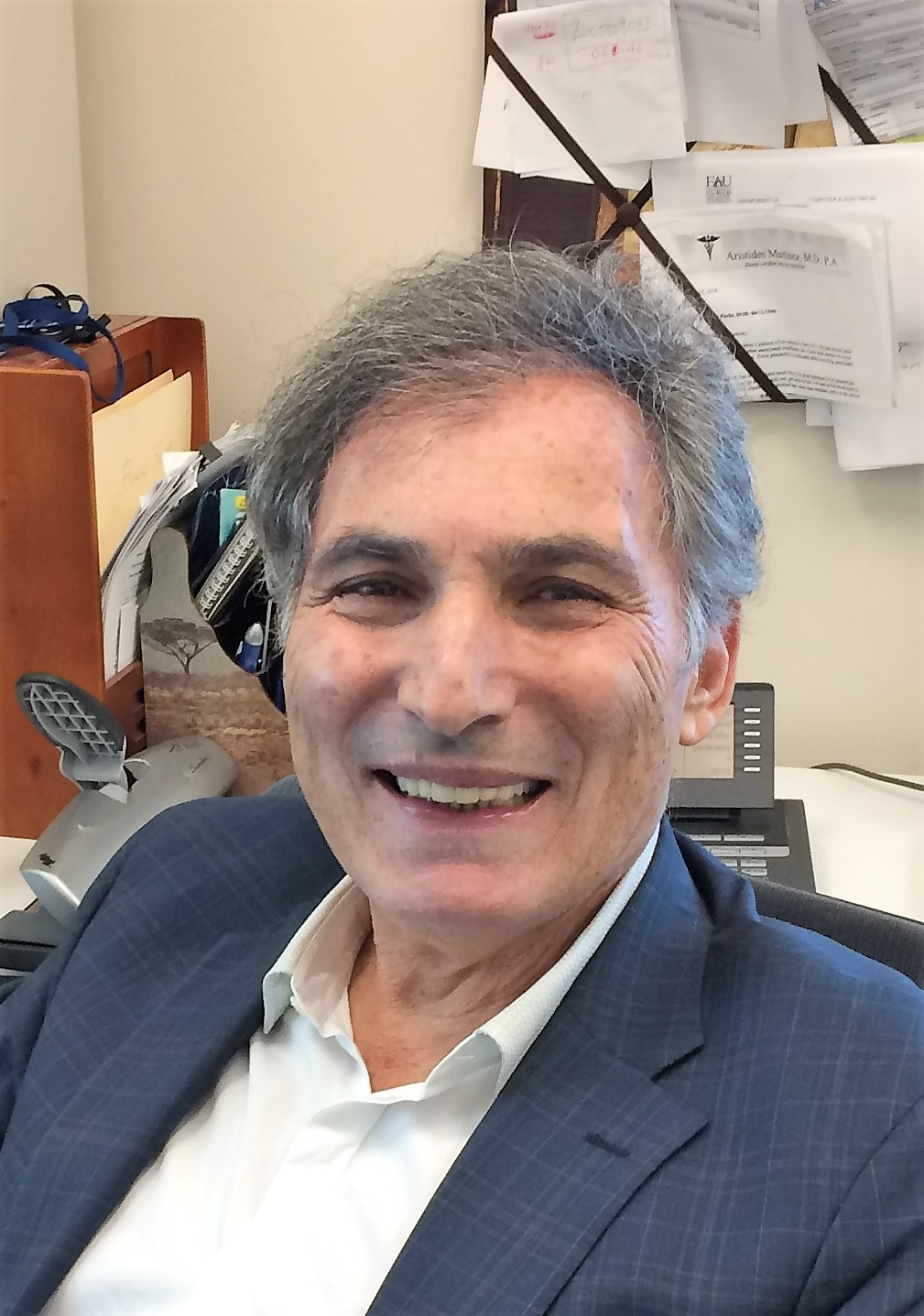
- Furht in 2019
- Education: University of Belgrade
- Scientific career
- Fields: Computer science and engineering
- Workplaces: Florida Atlantic University
- Website: https://faculty.eng.fau.edu/bfurht/

Borivoje "Borko" Furht is a Serbian American scientist and author in the field of computer science and engineering. He is a professor in the department of electrical and computer engineering and computer science (CEECS) at Florida Atlantic University in Boca Raton, Florida. He is also director of the National Science Foundation's Industry and University Cooperative Research Center for Advanced Knowledge Enablement at FAU. In 2019, he was inducted into the Academia Europaea.

== Career ==
Furht served as a senior researcher in the Institute Boris Kidric-Vinca in Yugoslavia (1970–82), an associate professor at University of Miami in Coral Gables, Florida (1982–87), and was vice president of research and a senior director of development at MODCOMP (1987–92). He was senior assistant vice president for engineering and technology at Florida Atlantic University (FAU) (2006–08), chair of FAU's the computer science and engineering department (2002–09) and chair of the department of computer and electrical engineering and computer science (2009–13).

He was founding editor-in-chief of Springer's Journal of Multimedia Tools and Applications and Journal of Big Data.
