= Alan Heldman =

American cardiologist

Alan W. Heldman (born 1962) is an American interventional cardiologist. Heldman graduated from Harvard College, University of Alabama School of Medicine, and completed residency and fellowship training at Johns Hopkins University School of Medicine. He held positions on the faculty of Johns Hopkins University from 1995 to 2007. In 2007, he became clinical chief of cardiology at the University of Miami's Miller School of Medicine.

He published one of the first studies showing that a drug-coated stent (now known as a drug-eluting stent) could prevent restenosis. His research interests include delivery of stem cells to the heart for repair of myocardial infarction. He is the principal investigator for a Phase I-II clinical trial of stem cell therapy for patients with left ventricular dysfunction after myocardial infarction.

His clinical interests include high risk and complex coronary intervention, treatment of hypertrophic cardiomyopathy, including with alcohol septal ablation, non-surgical treatments for valvular and structural heart disease, and strategies to eliminate complications from interventional cardiology procedures.

He was engaged to Malaysian actress Michelle Yeoh from 1998 to 2000.
