= Jacques Morcos =

American neurosurgeon

Jacques Morcos is an American neurosurgeon who is a professor and chair of the Vivian L. Smith Department of Neurosurgery at UTHealth Houston and co-director of UTHealth Houston Neurosciences. He holds the Nancy, Clive and Pierce Runnells Distinguished Chair in Neuroscience.

Morcos' training began in London at the National Hospital for Neurology and Neurosurgery at Queen Square and Maida Vale in London, England. He completed his residency at the University of Minnesota and his fellowships at the University of Florida and the Barrow Neurological Institute.

Morcos was on the University of Miami Miller School of Medicine faculty for 28 years, joining in 1995 as an assistant professor of clinical neurosurgery and otolaryngology. He was department co-chair, professor of clinical neurosurgery and otolaryngology, director of cerebrovascular surgery, director of skull base surgery, and division chief of cranial neurosurgery at Jackson Memorial Hospital in Miami.

He has received awards from the Royal College of Surgeons of Edinburgh, the American Board of Neurological Surgery, and is currently director of the North American Skull Base Society. He serves as an editor for World Neurosurgery and Journal of Neurosurgery and has chaired several international committees on neurological surgery. He has authored over 105 peer-reviewed journals and has given over 200 presentations worldwide. His research interests include vascular neuroanatomy and microsurgical techniques.
