= Howard Landy =

American neurosurgeon

Howard Landy is a professor of neurosurgery in the Department of Neurological Surgery and Radiation Oncology at the University of Miami and serves as the director of quality and patient safety at Jackson Memorial Hospital.

Landy's research interests include neurooncology and surgical correction for epilepsy. Dr. Landy finished his medical school, residency and fellowship at the University of Miami. He is a pioneer in the development of stereotactic neurosurgery and has conducting several research projects on clinical and laboratory radiobiology, including important work in gamma knife radiosurgery.
