= Eugene F. Provenzo =

American academic

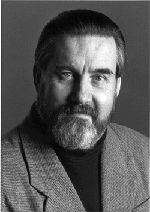
- Born: Eugene Francis Provenzo Jr. 1949 (age 76–77); Buffalo, New York, US
- Spouse: Asterie Baker (m. 1973)

Academic background
- Education: University of Rochester; Washington University in St. Louis
- Thesis: Education and the Aesopic Tradition (1976)

Academic work
- Discipline: Education
- Institutions: University of Miami

Eugene Francis Provenzo Jr. (born 1949) is an emeritus professor in the Department of Teaching and Learning at the University of Miami. He became a full professor in 1985.

== Career ==
Provenzo. was born in Buffalo, New York in 1949. He took his BA degree at the University of Rochester in 1972, where he studied History and Education (Honors and Distinction). He received a Ph.D. from Washington University's Graduate Institute of Education in the Philosophy and History of Education in 1976. In 1976, he joined the faculty of the School of Education at the University of Miami, becoming a full professor in 1985. He served as Associate Dean for Research for the School of Education (May 1986 to June 1988).

Provenzo's academic interests include the role of the teacher in American society, and the influence of computers and video games on children. His work has been reviewed in American and British media, including ABC World News Tonight, The Economist, and The New York Times. He has been involved in the analysis and archiving of works by W. E. B. Du Bois and, with Edmund Abaka, edited W.E.B. Du Bois on Africa, Left Coast Press, 2012. With H. Warren Button he coauthored History of Education and Culture in America (2nd edition, Prentice Hall, 1989).

Provenzo has studied Catholic education in the United States. In the mid-19th century standard textbooks used in the public schools had a distinctive Protestant tone, with occasional attacks on the Catholic Church in Europe. At the Third Plenary Council of Baltimore (1885) the bishops called for the preparation of acceptable textbooks, and Catholic publishers obliged. Professor Provenzo argues that by the 1890s Catholic educators had selected and adapted non-religious textbook content such that parochial students learned mainstream American political and cultural values without compromising their religious beliefs. The Catholic textbooks presented a generalized nondenominational Christianity and omitted sectarian arguments. There were a few exceptions such as occasional mention of Guardian Angels. Beyond the textbook matter parochial schools copied the new pedagogical techniques being introduced by the mainstream educational system. Apart from catechism classes (where the students learned that Protestants were likely damned to hell), the typical parochial school covered the same material in much the same way as the public schools. Irish Catholic women as nuns made up the parochial teaching staff, Furthermore Irish Cathollc lay women became increasingly prominent in the teaching staff of public schools in the major cities. After 1900 the mainstream textbooks largely dropped an anti-Catholic tone.

== See also ==
- History of Catholic education in the United States
