= Ralph L. Sacco =

American neurologist (1957–2023)

- Born: 1957; Margate City, New Jersey, U.S.
- Died: January 17, 2023 (aged 65–66); Long Island, New York, U.S.
- Spouse: Scott Dutcher

Academic background
- Education: BS, Bio-electrical Engineering, 1979, Cornell University; MD, 1983, Boston University School of Medicine; MS, Epidemiology, Columbia University Mailman School of Public Health

Academic work
- Institutions: Miller School of Medicine at the University of Miami; Columbia University Mailman School of Public Health

Ralph Lewis Sacco (1957 – January 17, 2023) was an American neurologist. He held the Olemberg Family Chair in Neurological Disorders, Miller Professor of Neurology, Public Health Sciences, Human Genetics, and Neurosurgery at the Miller School of Medicine at the University of Miami and Chief of the Neurology Service at Jackson Memorial Hospital. In 2020, Sacco was named editor-in-chief of the Stroke journal and the inaugural recipient of the Edgar J. Kenton III Lecture Award from the American Stroke Association.

Sacco was also the Executive Director of the Evelyn F. McKnight Brain Institute at the Miller School of Medicine at the University of Miami. He was the first neurologist to become president of the American Heart Association and the first former AHA president to become president of the American Academy of Neurology. He died on 17 January 2023 due to brain tumor.

== Early life and education ==
Sacco was born and raised in Margate City, New Jersey and attended Holy Spirit High School in Absecon, New Jersey. He was the oldest of five siblings born to a middle-class Italian family and was the first in his family to go to medical school. Sacco was encouraged by his aunt, who worked in a physician's office, to attend medical school.

Sacco attended Cornell University for his Bachelor of Science degree in bio-electrical engineering and enrolled at Boston University School of Medicine for his medical degree. He pursued his medical residence at Columbia University, where he began working with J.P. Mohr on the NINDS stroke databank, and with W. Allen Hauser, with whom he honed his skills in epidemiology.

== Career ==
In 1991, Sacco co-authored a study investigating the high rate of stroke risk among African Americans. This led to him assisting in the launch of Power To End Stroke, an initiative to heighten awareness of stroke risk among African Americans, through the American Heart Association (AHA). He was also the principal investigator of the Northern Manhattan Study, a research study of stroke and stroke risk factors in the Northern Manhattan community. During his final year at Columbia, Sacco received the AHA's Chairman’s Award for his "pioneering role in Power To End Stroke, an initiative to heighten awareness of stroke risk among African Americans."

In 2007, Sacco was hired as chairman of the department of neurology at the University of Miami's Miller School of Medicine. While serving as the Olemberg Family Chair in Neurological Diseases at the Miller School of Medicine and chief of the neurology service at Jackson Memorial Hospital, Sacco became the first neurologist to be named president of the American Heart Association. Upon completing his term, Sacco was honored by the University of Miami with the 2015 Provost’s Award for Scholarly Activity and appointed Executive Director of the Evelyn F. McKnight Brain Institute. In this role, he oversaw the Florida Puerto Rico Collaboration to Reduce Stroke Disparities and was a co-investigator of multiple other NIH grants. By 2017, he became the first former AHA president to become president of the American Academy of Neurology.

In recognition of his academic achievements, Sacco was elected a member of the National Academy of Medicine and honored with Boston University's 2019 Distinguished Alumni Award.

During the COVID-19 pandemic in North America, Sacco was named editor-in-chief of the Stroke journal. He was also the inaugural recipient of the Edgar J. Kenton III Lecture Award from the American Stroke Association.

== Personal life ==
Sacco lived with his partner, pharmacist Scott Dutcher, in Miami Beach, Florida.

== Death ==
Sacco died of glioblastoma on January 17, 2023, in Long Island, New York, at age 65.
