= List of Mu Phi Epsilon chapters =

Mu Phi Epsilon is a co-ed international professional music fraternity. It was founded as a music sorority in 1903, at the Metropolitan College of Music in Cincinnati, Ohio. In 1906, Mu Phi Epsilon absorbed Phi Mu Epsilon, a two-chapter music sorority, forming the Delta and Eta chapters. As of 2024, it has 227 collegiate chapters and 113 alumni chapters in the US and abroad.

== Collegiate chapters ==
Collegiate chapters take their names from the original Alpha chapter, progressing through the Greek alphabet and then using the prefixes Mu, Phi, and Epsilon. This was then followed by using the other prefixes of the Greek alphabet in alphabetical order, beginning with Alpha, Beta, Gamma, and so on. As of 2016, the prefix Eta is used for new chapters. International chapters have been Alpha Tau (Philippine Women's University, 1962), Beta Xi (University of the Philippines, 1967) and Delta Iota (University of Western Ontario, Canada, 1990).

Following is a list of the Mu Phi Epsilon collegiate chapters, with active chapters indicated in bold and inactive chapters and institutions in italics.

| Chapter | Charter date and range | Institution | Location | Status | Ref. |
|---|---|---|---|---|---|
| Alpha | November 13, 1903–1930 | Metropolitan College of Music | Cincinnati, Ohio | Inactive | |
| Beta | December 13, 1903 | New England Conservatory | Boston, Massachusetts | Inactive | |
| Gamma | May 20, 1904 | University of Michigan | Ann Arbor, Michigan | Inactive | |
| Delta | March 1, 1905 – 1942 | Detroit Conservatory of Music | Detroit, Michigan | Inactive | |
| Eta | December 8, 1905 – 1916 | Syracuse University | Syracuse, New York | Inactive | (Note: Chapter formed by absorbing Phi Mu Epsilon, a two-chapter music sorority.) |
| **Epsilon** | December 9, 1905 | Collingwood Conservatory | Toledo, Ohio | Active | |
| Zeta | December 9, 1905 | DePauw University | Greencastle, Indiana | Inactive | |
| Theta | October 17, 1906 – 1954 | Krueger School of Music | St. Louis, Missouri | Inactive | |
| Iota (see Upsilon) | October 19, 1906 – 1909 | Chicago Conservatory of Music | Chicago, Illinois | Inactive, Reestablished | |
| **Kappa** | November 3, 1906 | Butler University | Indianapolis, Indiana | Active | |
| **Lambda** | February 19, 1909 – 1942; xxxx ? | Ithaca College | Ithaca, New York | Active | |
| Iota Alpha | April 5, 1910 – 1954 | Chicago Musical College | Chicago, Illinois | Inactive | |
| **Mu** | February 6, 1911 | Brenau University | Gainesville, Georgia | Active | |
| **Nu** | March 3, 1911 | University of Oregon | Eugene, Oregon | Active | |
| Xi | April 12, 1911 | University of Kansas | Lawrence, Kansas | Inactive | |
| Omicron | February 7, 1912 – 1932 | Comb's Broad Street Conservatory | Philadelphia, Pennsylvania | Inactive | |
| Pi | May 29, 1912 | Lawrence Conservatory of Music | Appleton, Wisconsin | Inactive | |
| Rho | February 5, 1914 – 1917 | Von Unschuld University of Music | Washington, D.C. | Inactive | |
| Sigma | February 9, 1914 | Northwestern University | Evanston, Illinois | Inactive | |
| Tau | May 12, 1915 | University of Washington | Seattle, Washington | Inactive | |
| Upsilon (see Iota) | May 15, 1915 – 1955 | Chicago Conservatory of Music | Cincinnati, Ohio | Inactive | |
| **Phi** | May 15, 1915 | University of Mount Union | Alliance, Ohio | Active | |
| Chi | May 18, 1915 – 1942 | Pennsylvania College of Music | Meadville, Pennsylvania | Inactive | |
| Psi | May 30, 1915 | Bucknell University | Lewisburg, Pennsylvania | Inactive | |
| Omega | October 27, 1917 | Drake University | Des Moines, Iowa | Inactive | |
| Mu Alpha | October 27, 1917 | Simpson College | Indianola, Iowa | Inactive | |
| Rho Beta | January 2, 1918 – 1934 | Washington School of Music | Washington, D.C. | Inactive | |
| **Mu Beta** | February 13, 1919 | Washington State University | Pullman, Washington | Active | |
| Mu Gamma | March 27, 1919 | University of Nebraska–Lincoln | Lincoln, Nebraska | Inactive | |
| Mu Delta | March 29, 1919 – 1959 | Kansas City–Horner Conservatory of Music | Kansas City, Missouri | Inactive | (Note: Chapter formed at the Horner Institute of Fine Arts, later called the Kansas City–Horner Conservatory of Music. The conservatory merged with the University of Kansas City in 1959.) |
| Mu Epsilon | April 12, 1920 | MacPhail College of Music | Minneapolis, Minnesota | Inactive | |
| **Mu Eta** | November 13, 1920 | University of the Pacific | Stockton, California | Active | |
| Mu Zeta | November 20, 1920 | Whitman College | Walla Walla, Washington | Inactive | |
| Mu Theta | November 27, 1920 | University of Texas at Austin | Austin, Texas | Inactive | |
| Mu Iota | June 5, 1921 – 1938 | Columbia School of Music | Chicago, Illinois | Inactive | |
| Mu Kappa | May 30, 1922 | University of Oklahoma | Norman, Oklahoma | Inactive | |
| Mu Lambda | December 2, 1922 – 1930 | University of Wisconsin–Madison | Madison, Wisconsin | Inactive | |
| Mu Mu | December 19, 1922 | Kansas State University | Manhattan, Kansas | Inactive | |
| Mu Nu | January 5, 1923 | University of Southern California | Los Angeles, California | Inactive | |
| Mu Xi | January 20, 1923 | American Conservatory of Music | Chicago, Illinois | Inactive | |
| Mu Omicron | May 17, 1923 – 1955 | College of Music of Cincinnati | Cincinnati, Ohio | Inactive | (Note: Chapter closed when the college merged.) |
| **Mu Pi** | May 20, 1923 | Ohio Wesleyan University | Delaware, Ohio | Active | |
| Mu Rho | May 31, 1923 | Wolcott Conservatory of Music | Denver, Colorado | Inactive | |
| Mu Sigma | March 5, 1924 – 1940 | University of Louisville | Louisville, Kentucky | Inactive | |
| Mu Tau | May 30, 1924 | University of South Dakota | Vermillion, South Dakota | Inactive | |
| **Mu Upsilon** | February 28, 1925 | Eastman School of Music | Rochester, New York | Active | |
| Mu Theta Gamma | January 22, 1926 | University Conservatory of Music | Austin, Texas | Inactive | |
| **Mu Phi** | February 26, 1926 | Baldwin Wallace University | Berea, Ohio | Active | |
| Mu Chi | May 15, 1926 | Southern Methodist University | Dallas, Texas | Inactive | |
| **Mu Psi** | May 22, 1926 | Coe College | Cedar Rapids, Iowa | Active | |
| Tau Alpha | October 18, 1926 – 1946 | Trigonus | New York City, New York | Inactive | |
| Mu Omega | November 13, 1926 – 1940 | Atlanta Conservatory of Music | Atlanta, Georgia | Inactive | |
| Phi Alpha | June 4, 1927 – 1932 | Citywide | Miami, Florida | Inactive | |
| Phi Beta | June 4, 1927 – 1945 | University of Minnesota | Minneapolis, Minnesota | Inactive | |
| Phi Gamma | June 11, 1927 | Peabody Institute | Baltimore, Maryland | Inactive | |
| Phi Delta | May 19, 1928 – 1938 | University of Missouri | Columbia, Missouri | Inactive | |
| Phi Epsilon | March 16, 1929 | Emporia State University | Emporia, Kansas | Inactive | |
| Phi Zeta | November 9, 1929 | Morningside College | Sioux City, Iowa | Inactive | |
| Phi Eta | January 10, 1931 – 1942 | Michigan State University | Lansing, Michigan | Inactive | |
| Phi Theta | November 30, 1932 | Lindenwood University | St. Charles, Missouri | Inactive | |
| Phi Iota | May 27, 1935 | Concordia College | Moorhead, Minnesota | Inactive | |
| **Phi Kappa** | November 17, 1935 | Wayne State University | Detroit, Michigan | Active | |
| **Phi Lambda** | April 5, 1938 | Willamette University | Salem, Oregon | Active | |
| **Phi Mu** | April 9, 1938 | San Jose State University | San Jose, California | Active | |
| Phi Nu | April 12, 1938 | University of California, Los Angeles | Los Angeles, California | Inactive | |
| Mu Iota Delta | June 29, 1938 | Chicago Conservatory of Music | Chicago, Illinois | Inactive | |
| **Phi Xi** | May 27, 1939 | Baylor University | Waco, Texas | Active | |
| **Phi Omicron** | June 17, 1939 | Cleveland Institute of Music | Cleveland, Ohio | Active | |
| **Phi Pi** | June 22, 1941 | Wichita State University | Wichita, Kansas | Active | |
| Phi Rho | May 20, 1944 – 1959 | Minneapolis College of Music | Minneapolis, Minnesota | Inactive | |
| Phi Sigma | June 11, 1944 | DePaul University | Chicago, Illinois | Inactive | |
| **Phi Tau** | March 22, 1945 | University of North Texas | Denton, Texas | Active | |
| Phi Upsilon | March 24, 1945 | Boston University | Boston, Massachusetts | Inactive | |
| Phi Phi | April 26, 1945 – 1959 | University of Kansas City | Kansas City, Missouri | Inactive | |
| Phi Chi | November 4, 1945 | California State University, Fresno | Fresno, California | Inactive | |
| Phi Psi | March 2, 1946 | University of Mary Washington | Fredericksburg, Virginia | Inactive | |
| **Phi Omega** | April 6, 1946 | Westminster College | New Wilmington, Pennsylvania | Active | |
| Epsilon Alpha | May 10, 1946 – 1958 | St. Catherine University | Saint Paul, Minnesota | Inactive | |
| Epsilon Beta | May 18, 1946 – 1952 | Queens University of Charlotte | Charlotte, North Carolina | Inactive | |
| Epsilon Gamma | February 27, 1947 | Belhaven University | Jackson, Mississippi | Inactive | |
| Epsilon Delta | March 29, 1947 | Lewis & Clark College | Portland, Oregon | Inactive | |
| **Epsilon Epsilon** | May 21, 1948 | Texas Christian University | Fort Worth, Texas | Active | |
| Epsilon Zeta | May 23, 1948 | Hendrix College | Conway, Arkansas | Inactive | |
| Epsilon Eta | November 13, 1948 | Pepperdine University | Malibu, California | Inactive | |
| Epsilon Theta | March 19, 1949 | Linfield College | McMinnville, Oregon | Inactive | |
| Epsilon Iota | March 23, 1949 | Eastern Washington University | Cheney, Washington | Inactive | |
| **Epsilon Lambda** | April 23, 1950 | Eastern Michigan University | Ypsilanti, Michigan | Active | |
| Epsilon Kappa | May 20, 1950 | Southern Illinois University | Carbondale, Illinois | Inactive | |
| Epsilon Mu | May 27, 1950 | University of Utah | Salt Lake City, Utah | Inactive | |
| Epsilon Nu | May 28, 1950 | West Virginia University | Morgantown, West Virginia | Inactive | |
| Epsilon Xi | April 22, 1951 | University of Illinois at Urbana–Champaign | Urbana, Illinois | Inactive | |
| Epsilon Omicron | October 13, 1951 | Indiana University Bloomington | Bloomington, Indiana | Inactive | |
| **Epsilon Pi** | March 3, 1952 | Texas Tech University | Lubbock, Texas | Inactive | |
| Epsilon Rho | November 15, 1952 | University of Montana | Missoula, Montana | Inactive | |
| **Epsilon Sigma** | February 7, 1953 | Pacific Lutheran University | Tacoma, Washington | Active | |
| Epsilon Tau | April 25, 1953 | Washington University in St. Louis | St. Louis, Missouri | Inactive | |
| **Epsilon Upsilon** | May 23, 1953 | Duquesne University | Pittsburgh, Pennsylvania | Active | |
| **Epsilon Phi** | May 30, 1953 | Friends University | Wichita, Kansas | Active | |
| Epsilon Chi | May 14, 1955 – 1960 | Brigham Young University | Provo, Utah | Inactive | |
| Epsilon Psi | May 21, 1955 | The Juilliard School | New York City, New York | Inactive | |
| Epsilon Omega | October 15, 1955 | San Francisco State University | San Francisco, California | Inactive | |
| Alpha Alpha | November 13, 1955 | University of Cincinnati – College-Conservatory of Music | Cincinnati, Ohio | Inactive | |
| Alpha Beta | May 20, 1956 | University of Hartford | West Hartford, Connecticut | Inactive | |
| Alpha Gamma | April 28, 1957 | University of Southern Mississippi | Hattiesburg, Mississippi | Inactive | |
| **Alpha Delta** | May 4, 1958 | California State University, Sacramento | Sacramento, California | Active | |
| Alpha Epsilon | March 1, 1959 | Holy Names University | Oakland, California | Inactive | |
| **Alpha Zeta** | March 6, 1959 | Radford University | Radford, Virginia | Active | |
| Alpha Eta | March 14, 1959 | American University | Washington, D.C. | Inactive | |
| Alpha Theta | May 16, 1959 | Pennsylvania State University | University Park, Pennsylvania | Inactive | |
| Alpha Iota | May 30, 1959 | Midwestern State University | Wichita Falls, Texas | Inactive | |
| **Alpha Kappa** | November 13, 1959 | University of Missouri–Kansas City | Kansas City, Missouri | Active | |
| Alpha Lambda | November 15, 1959 | Portland State University | Portland, Oregon | Inactive | |
| **Alpha Mu** | April 24, 1960 | Missouri State University | Springfield, Missouri | Active | |
| **Alpha Nu** | April 30, 1960 | West Texas A&M University | Canyon, Texas | Active | |
| **Alpha Xi** | January 12, 1961 | University of North Carolina at Greensboro | Greensboro, North Carolina | Active | |
| Alpha Omicron | January 15, 1961 | Roosevelt University | Chicago, Illinois | Inactive | |
| **Alpha Pi** | October 29, 1961 | Texas State University | San Marcos, Texas | Active | |
| Alpha Rho | February 25, 1962 | Phillips University | Enid, Oklahoma | Inactive | |
| Alpha Sigma | March 31, 1962 | Abilene Christian University | Abilene, Texas | Inactive | |
| Alpha Tau | November 13, 1962 | Philippine Women's University | Manila, Philippines | Inactive | |
| Alpha Upsilon | April 25, 1963 | Furman University | Greenville, South Carolina | Inactive | |
| Alpha Phi | May 11, 1963 | Marylhurst University | Marylhurst, Oregon | Inactive | |
| Alpha Chi | March 8, 1964 | Southwestern College | Winfield, Kansas | Inactive | |
| Alpha Psi | February 28, 1965 | Whitworth College | Spokane, Washington | Inactive | |
| **Alpha Omega** | April 4, 1965 | Stephen F. Austin State University | Nacogdoches, Texas | Active | |
| **Beta Alpha** | April 10, 1965 | California State University, Fullerton | Fullerton, California | Active | |
| Beta Beta | April 20, 1965 | Jacksonville University | Jacksonville, Florida | Inactive | |
| Beta Gamma | November 20, 1965 | University of Alabama | Tuscaloosa, Alabama | Inactive | |
| Beta Delta | December 4, 1965 | University of California, Santa Barbara | Santa Barbara, California | Inactive | |
| Beta Epsilon | January 15, 1966 | Nazareth College | Rochester, New York | Inactive | |
| **Beta Zeta** | April 23, 1966 | Southern University | Baton Rouge, Louisiana | Active | |
| **Beta Eta** | May 14, 1966 | California State University, East Bay | Hayward, California | Active | |
| **Beta Theta** | May 29, 1966 | Tennessee Technological University | Cookeville, Tennessee | Active | |
| Beta Iota | January 7, 1967 | Southern Illinois University Edwardsville | Edwardsville, Illinois | Inactive | |
| Beta Kappa | January 14, 1967 | Trinity University | San Antonio, Texas | Inactive | |
| Beta Lambda | February 11, 1967 | California State University, Chico | Chico, California | Inactive | |
| **Beta Mu** | May 22, 1967 | Texas A&M University–Commerce | Commerce, Texas | Active | |
| Beta Xi | October 22, 1967 | University of the Philippines | Quezon City, Philippines | Inactive | |
| Beta Nu | November 11, 1967 | Dickinson State University | Dickinson, North Dakota | Inactive | |
| **Beta Omicron** | February 16, 1968 | Western Illinois University | Macomb, Illinois | Active | |
| **Beta Pi** | February 18, 1968 | Nebraska Wesleyan University | Lincoln, Nebraska | Active | |
| Beta Rho | October 12, 1968 | Wartburg College | Waverly, Iowa | Inactive | |
| Beta Sigma | November 24, 1968 | Western Oregon University | Monmouth, Oregon | Inactive | |
| Beta Tau | January 18, 1969 | Georgia State University | Atlanta, Georgia | Inactive | |
| Beta Upsilon | February 16, 1969 | Towson University | Baltimore, Maryland | Inactive | |
| Beta Phi | October 26, 1969 | Seattle Pacific University | Seattle, Washington | Inactive | |
| Beta Chi | November 9, 1969 | Florida State University | Tallahassee, Florida | Inactive | |
| **Beta Psi** | November 23, 1969 | University of Indianapolis | Indianapolis, Indiana | Active | |
| Beta Omega | December 7, 1969 | Ball State University | Muncie, Indiana | Inactive | |
| Gamma Alpha | May 2, 1971 | Evangel College | Springfield, Missouri | Inactive | |
| Gamma Beta | March 4, 1972 | Augustana University | Sioux Falls, South Dakota | Inactive | |
| **Gamma Gamma** | March 25, 1972 | Southwestern Oklahoma State University | Weatherford, Oklahoma | Active | |
| Gamma Delta | April 29, 1972 | University of Texas Rio Grande Valley | Edinburg, Texas | Inactive | |
| Gamma Epsilon | May 2, 1972 | Oral Roberts University | Tulsa, Oklahoma | Inactive | |
| **Gamma Zeta** | May 26, 1972 | Delta State University | Cleveland, Mississippi | Active | |
| **Gamma Eta** | November 18, 1972 | Central State University | Wilberforce, Ohio | Active | |
| Gamma Theta | March 3, 1973 | University of Bridgeport | Bridgeport, Connecticut | Inactive | |
| Gamma Iota | May 19, 1973 | Dallas Baptist University | Dallas, Texas | Inactive | |
| Gamma Kappa | November 6, 1973 | Boise State University | Boise, Idaho | Inactive | |
| Gamma Lambda | February 16, 1974 | Loretto Heights College | Denver, Colorado | Inactive | |
| Gamma Mu | March 24, 1974 | University of California, Riverside | Riverside, California | Inactive | |
| Gamma Nu | April 21, 1974 | Chicago State University | Chicago, Illinois | Inactive | |
| Gamma Xi | May 15, 1974 | University of New Orleans | New Orleans, Louisiana | Inactive | |
| Gamma Pi | February 1, 1975 | Shorter University | Rome, Georgia | Inactive | |
| Gamma Omicron | February 2, 1965 | Olivet College | Olivet, Michigan | Inactive | |
| Gamma Rho | February 2, 1966 | North Carolina A&T State University | Greensboro, North Carolina | Inactive | |
| **Gamma Sigma** | May 8, 1976 | California State University, Dominguez Hills | Carson, California | Active | |
| Gamma Tau | December 5, 1976 | University of St. Thomas | Houston, Texas | Inactive | |
| Gamma Upsilon | March 13, 1977 | Caldwell University | Caldwell, New Jersey | Inactive | |
| Gamma Phi | March 16, 1977 | Cleveland State University | Cleveland, Ohio | Inactive | |
| Gamma Chi | June 17, 1978 | California State Polytechnic University, Pomona | Pomona, California | Inactive | |
| Gamma Psi | May 6, 1979 | Saint Mary-of-the-Woods College | Saint Mary-of-the-Woods, Indiana | Inactive | |
| Gamma Omega | May 1, 1982 | Rhode Island College | Providence, Rhode Island | Inactive | |
| Delta Alpha | December 4, 1982 | California State University, Stanislaus | Turlock, California | Inactive | |
| Delta Beta | January 15, 1983 | University of Texas, San Antonio | San Antonio, Texas | Inactive | |
| Delta Gamma | April 20, 1983 | Grand Valley State University | Allendale, Michigan | Inactive | |
| Delta Delta | February 5, 1984 | University of Maryland, College Park | College Park, Maryland | Inactive | |
| Delta Epsilon | June 7, 1984 | Columbus State University | Columbus, Georgia | Inactive | |
| **Delta Zeta** | April 22, 1987 | Emory University | Atlanta, Georgia | Active | |
| Delta Eta | April 24, 1988 | University of North Florida | Jacksonville, Florida | Inactive | |
| Delta Theta | October 15, 1989 | Ohio Northern University | Ada, Ohio | Inactive | |
| Delta Iota | February 3, 1990 | University of Western Ontario | London, Ontario, Canada | Inactive | |
| Delta Kappa | February 10, 1991 | Cumberland College | Williamsburg, Kentucky | Inactive | |
| Delta Lambda | September 22, 1991 | Augsburg College | Minneapolis, Minnesota | Inactive | |
| **Delta Mu** | May 8, 1994 | Slippery Rock University | Slippery Rock, Pennsylvania | Inactive | |
| Delta Nu | February 7, 1998 | Millsaps College | Jackson, Mississippi | Inactive | |
| Delta Xi | April 18, 1998 | Arizona State University | Tempe, Arizona | Inactive | |
| Delta Omicron | May 2, 1998 | Salisbury State University | Salisbury, Maryland | Inactive | |
| **Delta Pi** | May 14, 1998 | Tarleton State University | Stephenville, Texas | Active | |
| **Delta Rho** | February 27, 2000 | University of Colorado Boulder | Boulder, Colorado | Active | |
| **Delta Sigma** | June 3, 2000 | University of California, Irvine | Irvine, California | Active | |
| **Delta Tau** | April 21, 2001 | Mercer University | Macon, Georgia | Active | |
| Delta Upsilon | May 5, 2001 | State University of New York at Geneseo | Geneseo, New York | Inactive | |
| Delta Phi | April 22, 2002 | Averett University | Danville, Virginia | Inactive | |
| Delta Chi | March 28, 2003 | McNeese State University | Lake Charles, Louisiana | Inactive | |
| Delta Psi | April 26, 2003 | Clayton State University | Morrow, Georgia | Inactive | |
| Delta Omega | March 27, 2004 | Our Lady of the Lake University | San Antonio, Texas | Inactive | |
| **Zeta Alpha** | April 5, 2005 | Williams Baptist University | Walnut Ridge, Arkansas | Active | |
| **Zeta Beta** | April 23, 2005 | Cameron University | Lawton, Oklahoma | Active | |
| Zeta Gamma | May 11, 2006 | Augusta State University | Augusta, Georgia | Inactive | |
| Zeta Delta | March 3, 2007 | University of La Verne | La Verne, California | Inactive | |
| **Zeta Zeta** | November 5, 2008 | Elon University | Elon, North Carolina | Active | |
| **Zeta Eta** | November 12, 2008 | Binghamton University | Binghamton, New York | Active | |
| **Zeta Theta** | April 28, 2009 | University of Lynchburg | Lynchburg, Virginia | Active | |
| **Zeta Epsilon** | April 29, 2009 | Randolph–Macon College | Ashland, Virginia | Active | |
| Zeta Iota | January 25, 2011 | LaGrange College | LaGrange, Georgia | Inactive | |
| **Zeta Kappa** | April 5, 2011 | Young Harris College | Young Harris, Georgia | Active | |
| Zeta Lambda | April 13, 2011 | Waldorf College | Forest City, Iowa | Inactive | |
| Zeta Mu | April 16, 2011 | Texas A&M University | College Station, Texas | Inactive | |
| Zeta Nu | April 22, 2012 | St. Mary's University, Texas | San Antonio, Texas | Inactive | |
| Zeta Xi | October 28, 2012 | Howard University | Washington, D.C. | Inactive | |
| **Zeta Omicron** | November 28, 2012 | Reinhardt University | Waleska, Georgia | Active | |
| Zeta Pi | December 8, 2012 | Lake Forest College | Lake Forest, Illinois | Inactive | |
| Zeta Rho | March 9, 2013 | University of Minnesota Duluth | Duluth, Minnesota | Inactive | |
| Zeta Sigma | April 7, 2013 | High Point University | High Point, North Carolina | Inactive | |
| Zeta Tau | April 17, 2013 | Gonzaga University | Spokane, Washington | Inactive | |
| Zeta Upsilon | December 8, 2013 | Santa Monica College | Santa Monica, California | Inactive | |
| Zeta Phi | April 11, 2014 | University of North Carolina Wilmington | Wilmington, North Carolina | Inactive | |
| Zeta Chi | April 19, 2015 | George Fox University | Newberg, Oregon | Inactive | |
| Zeta Psi | May 2, 2015 | University of San Diego | San Diego, California | Inactive | |
| **Zeta Omega** | April 3, 2016 | Illinois College | Jacksonville, Illinois | Active | |
| **Eta Alpha** | October 11, 2016 | Rhodes College | Memphis, Tennessee | Active | |
| Eta Beta | December 4, 2016 | Boston Conservatory at Berklee | Boston, Massachusetts | Inactive | |
| **Eta Gamma** | May 2, 2017 | Virginia Wesleyan University | Norfolk, Virginia | Active | |
| **Eta Delta** | April 20, 2018 | Ripon College | Ripon, Wisconsin | Active | |
| **Eta Epsilon** | January 19, 2019 | Florida International University | Miami, Florida | Active | |
| **Eta Eta** | September 21, 2019 | Oglethorpe University | Atlanta, Georgia | Active | |
| **Omega Omega** | | National | | Active | |

== Alumni chapters ==
Following is a list of Mu Phi Epsilon alumni chapters. Active chapters are indicated in bold. Inactive chapters are in italics.

| Chapter Name | Date of Installation | Location | State | Status | Ref. |
|---|---|---|---|---|---|
| **Ann Arbor** | September 22, 1913 | Ann Arbor, Michigan | Michigan | Active | |
| Cincinnati | April 14, 1914 | Cincinnati, Ohio | Ohio | Inactive | |
| **St. Louis Area** | April 18, 1914 | St. Louis, Missouri | Missouri | Active | |
| **Toledo** | 1915 | Toledo, Ohio | Ohio | Active | |
| **Detroit** | May 2, 1916 | Detroit, Michigan | Michigan | Active | |
| Chicago | November 13, 1917 | Chicago, Illinois | Illinois | Inactive | |
| **Los Angeles** | March 20, 1919 | Los Angeles, California | California | Active | |
| **Portland** | September 1919 | Portland, Oregon | Oregon | Active | |
| **Boston** | January 7, 1920 | Boston, Massachusetts | Massachusetts | Active | |
| Des Moines | August 1922 | Des Moines, Iowa | Iowa | Inactive | |
| **New York City** | October 1922 | New York City, New York | New York | Active | |
| **Indianapolis** | October 13, 1922 | Indianapolis, Indiana | Indiana | Active | |
| **Lincoln** | February 1923 | Lincoln, Nebraska | Nebraska | Active | |
| Greater Minneapolis-Day | March 1923 | Minneapolis, Minnesota | Minnesota | Consolidated | (Note: Chapter merged with Minneapolis/St. Paul chapter.) |
| Cleveland | November 13, 1923 – 2014 | Cleveland, Ohio | Ohio | Inactive | |
| Seattle | October 1924 | Seattle, Washington | Washington | Inactive | |
| Philadelphia | 1926 | Philadelphia, Pennsylvania | Pennsylvania | Inactive | |
| Kansas City-Day | November 26, 1926 | Kansas City, Missouri | Missouri | Consolidated | (Note: Chapter merged with the Kansas City chapter.) |
| Appleton | November 5, 1927 | Appleton, Wisconsin | Wisconsin | Inactive | |
| Pittsburgh | October 3, 1929 | Pittsburgh, Pennsylvania | Pennsylvania | Inactive | |
| **San Francisco** | November 17, 1929 | San Francisco, California | California | Active | |
| **Dallas** | February 26, 1931 | Dallas, Texas | Texas | Active | |
| **Alliance** | June 22, 1933 | Alliance, Ohio | Ohio | Active | |
| **Denver** | June 16, 1936 | Denver, Colorado | Colorado | Active | |
| Lansing-East Lansing | May 26, 1939 | Lansing and East Lansing, Michigan | Michigan | Inactive | |
| Meadville | June 24, 1939 | Meadville, Pennsylvania | Pennsylvania | Inactive | |
| Beverly Hills | December 8, 1946 | Beverly Hills, California | California | Inactive | |
| **Wichita** | December 29, 1946 | Wichita, Kansas | Kansas | Active | |
| Greater Chicago Area | June 2, 1948 | Chicago, Illinois | Illinois | Inactive | |
| **Central Oklahoma** | June 5, 1948 | Oklahoma | | Active | |
| Stockton | 1949 | Stockton, California | California | Inactive | |
| Spokane | November 8, 1949 | Spokane, Washington | Washington | Inactive | |
| Tacoma | June 30, 1950 | Tacoma, Washington | Washington | Inactive | |
| Columbus | October 15, 1950 | Columbus, Ohio | Ohio | Inactive | |
| **San José** | February 18, 1951 | San Jose, California | California | Active | |
| **Sacramento** | January 27, 1952 | Sacramento, California | California | Active | |
| Cedar Rapids | February 12, 1952 | Cedar Rapids, Iowa | Iowa | Inactive | |
| Tulsa | February 19, 1952 | Tulsa, Oklahoma | Oklahoma | Inactive | |
| Fort Worth | February 29, 1952 | Fort Worth, Texas | Texas | Inactive | |
| Miami | March 29, 1952 | Miami, Florida | Florida | Inactive | |
| Eugene | May 2, 1952 | Eugene, Oregon | Oregon | Inactive | |
| **San Diego** | May 18, 1952 | San Diego, California | California | Active | |
| Salt Lake City | June 10, 1952 | Salt Lake City, Utah | Utah | Inactive | |
| Maumee Valley | June 20, 1952 | | Ohio | Consolidated | (Note: Chapter merged with the Toledo chapter.) |
| Columbia | October 17, 1952 | Columbia, Missouri | Missouri | Inactive | |
| Pasadena | October 17, 1952 | Pasadena, California | California | Inactive | |
| **Rochester** | November 8, 1952 | Rochester, New York | New York | Active | |
| Evansville | December 16, 1952 | Evansville, Indiana | Indiana | Inactive | |
| Beach Cities South | May 26, 1953 | | California | Inactive | |
| Greater Minneapolis-Evening | September 20, 1955 | Minneapolis, Minnesota | Minnesota | Consolidated | |
| **Palo Alto** | September 26, 1955 | Palo Alto, California | California | Active | |
| Connecticut Valley | October 15, 1955 | | Connecticut | Inactive | |
| **Urbana-Champaign** | October 20, 1955 | Urbana and Champaign, Illinois | Illinois | Active | |
| Salem | April 9, 1956 | Salem, Oregon | Oregon | Inactive | |
| **Fresno** | June 2, 1956 | Fresno, California | California | Active | |
| Central Chicago | October 20, 1956 | Chicago, Illinois | Illinois | Inactive | |
| Baltimore | December 1, 1956 | Baltimore, Maryland | Maryland | Inactive | |
| San Fernando Valley | November 7, 1956 | San Fernando, California | California | Consolidated | (Note: Chapter merged with the Los Angeles chapter.) |
| Milwaukee | 1958 | Milwaukee, Wisconsin | Wisconsin | Inactive | |
| Fargo | January 22, 1958 | Fargo, North Dakota | North Dakota | Inactive | |
| Dayton | March 2, 1958 | Dayton, Ohio | Ohio | Inactive | |
| Cleveland Heights | March 5, 1958 | Cleveland Heights, Ohio | Ohio | Consolidated | (Note: Chapter merged with the Cleveland chapter.) |
| Kansas City-Evening | November 9, 1958 | Kansas City, Missouri | Missouri | Consolidated | |
| **Atlanta** | May 24, 1959 | Atlanta, Georgia | Georgia | Active | |
| Jackson | May 25, 1959 | Jackson, Mississippi | Mississippi | Inactive | |
| Albuquerque | May 31, 1959 | Albuquerque, New Mexico | New Mexico | Inactive | |
| Berkeley | November 1, 1959 | Berkeley, California | California | Inactive | |
| Gainesville | November 13, 1959 | Gainesville, Florida | Georgia | Inactive | |
| **Austin** | December 14, 1959 | Austin, Texas | Texas | Active | |
| Bloomington | January 14, 1962 | Bloomington, Indiana | Indiana | Inactive | |
| Sioux City | February 26, 1962 | Sioux City, Iowa | Iowa | Inactive | |
| **Fullerton** | September 27, 1963 | Fullerton, California | California | Active | |
| Riverside | April 8, 1964 | Riverside, California | California | Inactive | |
| Wichita Falls | October 3, 1964 | Wichita Falls, Texas | Texas | Inactive | |
| **Palos Verdes/South Bay** | October 18, 1964 | California | | Active | |
| Lewisburg | January 14, 1965 | Lewisburg, Pennsylvania | Pennsylvania | Inactive | |
| New Orleans | April 4, 1965 | New Orleans, Louisiana | Louisiana | Inactive | |
| St. Petersburg | April 21, 1965 | St. Petersburg, Florida | Florida | Inactive | |
| Hattiesburg | October 23, 1965 | Hattiesburg, Mississippi | Mississippi | Inactive | |
| Pullman | March 1, 1966 | Pullman, Washington | Washington | Inactive | |
| **Denton** | April 16, 1966 | Denton, Texas | Texas | Active | |
| Springfield | May 24, 1966 | Springfield, Missouri | Missouri | Inactive | |
| Houston | January 15, 1967 | Houston, Texas | Texas | Inactive | |
| **Lawrence** | April 15, 1967 | Lawrence, Kansas | Kansas | Active | |
| Amarillo | September 24, 1967 | Amarillo, Texas | Texas | Inactive | |
| Emporia | October 14, 1967 | Emporia, Kansas | Kansas | Inactive | |
| Greensboro | November 5, 1967 | Greensboro, North Carolina | North Carolina | Inactive | |
| Chicago Southwest | October 13, 1968 | Chicago, Illinois | Illinois | Consolidated | (Note: Chapter merged with the Greater Chicago chapter.) |
| Muncie | May 18, 1969 | Muncie, Indiana | Indiana | Inactive | |
| Lubbock | October 10, 1970 | Lubbock, Texas | Texas | Inactive | |
| Phoenix Area | October 24, 1970 | Phoenix, Arizona | Arizona | Inactive | |
| Tuscaloosa | April 25, 1971 | Tuscaloosa, Alabama | Alabama | Inactive | |
| Jacksonville | September 10, 1973 | Jacksonville, Florida | Florida | Inactive | |
| Santa Barbara | March 21, 1974 | Santa Barbara, California | California | Inactive | |
| Enid | May 12, 1974 | Enid, Oklahoma | Oklahoma | Inactive | |
| Claremont | January 17, 1976 | Claremont, California | California | Inactive | |
| Terre Haute | May 6, 1979 | Terre Haute, Indiana | Indiana | Inactive | |
| Edinburg Area | April 26, 1980 | Edinburg, Texas | Texas | Inactive | |
| Laguna Beach | March 29, 1981 | Laguna Beach, California | California | Inactive | |
| Dickinson | May 3, 1981 | Dickinson, North Dakota | North Dakota | Inactive | |
| Princeton | February 9, 1986 | Princeton, New Jersey | New Jersey | Inactive | |
| **Ithaca** | June 2, 1991 | Ithaca | New York | Active | |
| San Joaquin Valley | April 19, 1997 | | California | Inactive | |
| **San Antonio** | May 18, 2000 | San Antonio | Texas | Active | |
| **Minneapolis/St. Paul** | 2001 | Minneapolis and Saint Paul | Minnesota | Active | |
| **Kansas City** | 2004 | Kansas City | Missouri | Active | |
| **Colorado Springs** | September 23, 2012 | Colorado Springs | Colorado | Active | |
| **Baton Rouge** | August 28, 2013 | Baton Rouge | Louisiana | Active | |
| **Roanoke Valley** | December 9, 2017 | Roanoke | Virginia | Active | |
| **Washington, D.C.** | | Washington, D.C. | District of Columbia | Active | |
