= William Seth Lampe =

American journalist

William Seth Lampe (February 24, 1906 – May 18, 1992) was an American journalist, managing editor of the Detroit Times (1942-1955), editor of the Pittsburgh Sun-Telegraph (1955-1958), director of special editorial projects for the Hearst Corporation (1957- ), and a communications executive.

== Early life and education ==
Lampe was born in Wilkinsburg, Pennsylvania, and attended the University of Pittsburgh.

== Career ==
He moved to Miami in 1926 to work as a sports reporter for The Miami News, and also worked as a publicist and assistant to Bowman Foster Ashe, the first president of the University of Miami.

Lampe wrote the words to the University of Miami Alma Mater in September 1926, music by Christine Asdurian. in anticipation of the University of Miami's first collegiate football game. The game was called off due to a major hurricane that ravaged the region just as the new university’s first classes were about to begin. That catastrophe may have given rise to the team’s name, the Miami Hurricanes. The Alma Mater premiered the following month after Miami began its slow recovery from the storm.

Lampe moved back to Pittsburgh in 1928 and married Harriett Richmond. He worked as a newspaper reporter and editor, then became editor in charge of special projects for the Hearst Corporation. The Hearst newspapers advocated nationally for the creation of the United States Interstate Highway System, which was authorized by President Dwight D. Eisenhower in 1956.

He then moved on from the newspaper business and became the executive vice president of Communications Counselors, Inc., a subsidiary of the McCann Erickson advertising agency in Detroit. He helped found the Buick Open Golf Tournament at Warwick Hills Country Club in 1958.

Lampe was named an honorary alumnus of the University of Miami in 1948. In 1990 he was named an honorary alumnus of the University of Miami's marching band, the Band of the Hour, and inducted posthumously into its Hall of Fame in 1994.

== Death ==
He died in Volusia, Florida, on May 18, 1992 at the age of 86.
