= Earle Chester Smith =

American pianist and pedagogue

Earle Chester Smith (1883–1951) was an American pianist and pedagogue whose teaching career spanned 50 years, primarily in Atlanta, Georgia.

== Early life ==
Earle Chester Smith was born in Mount Carroll, Illinois on July 21, 1883, to Ruth Anna Jefferis and Augustus “Gus” H. Smith. He had two siblings Edna May Smith Garwick (1882–1953) and Walter Eugene Smith (1892–1959).

During his high school years he attended the Frances Shimer Academy of the University of Chicago, which served as the public school for the town of Mount Carroll. He graduated in 1901.

== Career highlights ==
Earle Chester Smith studied piano in Chicago with Rudolph Ganz, Felix Borowski, and Dr. Louis Falk. He taught private piano students, and also at the Grand Island College Conservatory in Nebraska from 1907 to 1910.

In 1911 he traveled to Germany to study music with Robert Teichmüller in Leipzig, and Maurice Aronson and Leopold Godowsky in Berlin. He also taught private piano pupils in Berlin from 1911 to 1913.

He returned to the United States in 1914 to serve as director of the piano departments of Cox College in College Park, Georgia, as well as the Atlanta Conservatory of Music located at Peachtree and Broad Streets in Atlanta, Georgia. The management of the two schools had merged in 1911.

He authored “Applied Touch and Technic for the Piano,” published in 1915 by the Clayton F. Summy Co. (Chicago).

In 1925 Smith took a three-year leave of absence from the Atlanta Conservatory to help organize the piano department of the Miami Conservatory of Music. Sidney Foster was one of his private piano students.

He also served as piano department chair for the School of Music at the University of Miami from 1926 to 1928 where Bertha Foster was dean.

University of Miami alumni Christine Asdurian and Joe Tarpley were two of his advanced students.

Earle Chester Smith rejoined the piano faculty of the Atlanta Conservatory of Music in June 1928. In 1933 he opened a teaching studio at 371 Tenth Street near Piedmont Park in Atlanta where he taught private students two days a week and hosted numerous recitals and musicales, and continued to teach four days per week at the Atlanta Conservatory. The conservatory closed in 1941. Earle Chester Smith continued to teach private piano students until his retirement in May 1948.

== Retirement ==
In 1949 he moved to Orlando, Florida but returned to Atlanta 2 years later where he died on December 3, 1951, at age 68.
