= Phi Delta (disambiguation) =

Phi Delta may refer to:

- Phi Delta (medical), a North American medical fraternity (1901–1918)
- Phi Delta (sorority), an American collegiate sorority (1927–1973)
