= Phi Delta =

Defunct American collegiate sorority

- ΦΔ
- Founded: January 19, 1927; 99 years ago New York, US
- Type: Social
- Affiliation: Independent
- Status: Defunct
- Scope: National
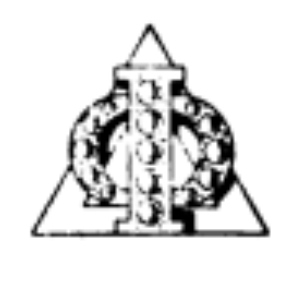
- Member badge

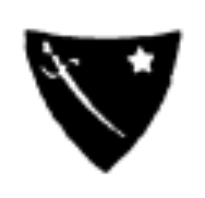
- Pledge pin
- Colors: Gold and Black
- Flower: Yellow tea rose
- Publication: Phi Delt
- Chapters: 9
- Headquarters: United States

Phi Delta (ΦΔ) was an American college sorority. It formed in 1927 through the merger of local sororities at New York University in New York City and New York State Teachers Colleges at Albany. The sorority grew to include nine chapters but struggled during the Great Depression. The withdrawal of three chapters in 1935 resulted in a breakdown of national operations, with the remaining chapters becoming local sororities again. The chapter at Albany continued as a local fraternity until 1973.

== History ==
=== Predecessors and merger ===
Sigma Epsilon was a local sorority that was established at New York University in New York City on October 24, 1919. Its founders were Charlotte Behnken, Effe Dooling, Mary Guinee, Katherine Kirwin, and Florence Sullivan.

Alpha Delta Omicron was a local sorority established at the New York State Teachers College at Albany in 1923. Sigma Epsilon and Alpha Delta Omicron merged to form Phi Delta on January 19, 1927.

=== Phi Delta ===
Baird's Manual stated the objects of Phi Delta as "to create a friendly spirit among the girls of the institutions represented, to uphold the honor spirit of the institution, and to develop the abilities of members for most effective college life". Phi Delta was founded for Protestant women.

By 1930, there were six active chapters and 223 members. It added two additional chapters, for a total of eight chapters by 1932. Phi Delta struggled during the Great Depression. In 1935, the chapters at New York University and George Washington University withdrew and affiliated with Beta Phi Alpha. That same year, the chapter at the University of Cincinnati withdrew and joined Alpha Delta Pi.

The withdrawal of these three chapters in 1935 resulted in a breakdown of national operations, where the remaining chapters closed or became local entities once again.

=== Phi Delta (local) ===
The UCLA chapter struggled for a short time as a local and ultimately dissolved.

For the next forty years, Alpha chapter functioned as a typical social sorority. The chapter had residences at 146 and 278 Western Ave. The constitution (1967) gave the purpose of the sorority "as a social and fraternal organization, shall be to uphold the honor Spirit of the University, to create a friendlier spirit among the girls of the University, to strengthen the scholastic standing of the University, and to develop the abilities of the girls for the benefit of the college life."

Article IV, Section VII of the Constitution explained that Phi Delta permitted honorary membership "to those men and women who have shown distinguished ability in the field of education and leadership, and possess such qualities as Phi Delta stands for; and men and women who have shown sincere interest and have given service to Phi Delta, upon election." Section X of the same Article explained faculty membership as "a man or woman of the University faculty who has shown distinguished ability in the field of education and leadership."

During the 1960s, Phi Delta opened membership to African-American and Jewish women. In 1973, the sorority dissolved.

== Symbols ==
Phi Delta's coat-of-arms was "...sable a sinister bend or, superimposed by a white open book proper on which in turn is superimposed a torch palewise, or, flamed argent. [With a] Crest. An eagle displayed, or" ("or" meaning "golden", in heraldry). The motto was the sorority's name, which was placed on the banner underneath the shield.

Baird's Manual (12th edition) described the insignia as "The badge is a Phi, studded with pearls, superimposed upon a plain gold Delta". Its pledge pin was a black shield, with a gold sword and star. The sorority's colors were gold and black. Its flower was the yellow tea rose. The Phi Delt was the bi-monthly magazine.

October 25, 1919, the founding date of Sigma Epsilon, was celebrated as Phi Delta's official founding date.

== Chapters ==
Following are the chapters of Phi Delta.

| Chapter | Charter date and range | Institution | Location | Status | Ref. |
|---|---|---|---|---|---|
| Alpha | January 19, 1927 – 1973 | University at Albany, SUNY | Albany, New York | Inactive | (Note: The Alpha chapter originated on the New York State Teachers College at Albany campus as Alpha Delta Omicron (local) in 1923. After 1935, it reverted to local status, going inactive in 1973.) |
| Beta | January 19, 1927 – 1935 | New York University | Manhattan, New York | Withdrew (ΒΦΑ) | (Note: The Beta chapter originated as Sigma Epsilon (local) on October 25, 1919.) (Note: Upon withdrawal, in 1935 Beta chapter became the Alpha Theta chapter of Beta Phi Alpha, which would later revive the Beta Omega chapter of Delta Zeta.) |
| Gamma | 1927–1932 | University of California, Los Angeles | Los Angeles, California | Withdrew (local) | (Note: The Gamma chapter originated as Pi Sigma (local) in 1925.) |
| Delta | 1927-19xx ? | Hunter College | New York City, New York | Inactive | |
| Epsilon | 1927–1935 | University of Cincinnati | Cincinnati, Ohio | Withdrew (ΑΔΠ) | (Note: The Epsilon chapter originated as Phi Beta (local) in 1924.) (Note: Upon withdrawal, in 1935 Epsilon chapter became the Beta Pi chapter of Alpha Delta Pi.) |
| Zeta | 1927–1935 | George Washington University | Washington, D.C. | Withdrew (ΒΦΑ) | (Note: The Zeta chapter originated as Alpha Sigma Theta (local) in 1925. Upon withdrawal, in 1935 Zeta chapter became the Alpha Eta chapter of Beta Phi Alpha.) |
| Eta | 1927–1934 | Temple University | Philadelphia, Pennsylvania | Withdrew (local) | (Note: The Eta chapter originated as Delta Omega (local) in 1890. After 1935, it reverted to local status under its former name, closing in 1938.) |
| Iota | 1931–1935 | University of California, Berkeley | Berkeley, California | Withdrew (local) | (Note: The Iota chapter originated as the Newegita Club (local) in 1923. After 1935, it reverted to local status and continued to operate until 1951.) |
| Theta | 1932–1935 | Adelphi University | Garden City, New York | Withdrew (local) | (Note: The Theta chapter originated as Alpha Sigma Chi (local) in 1929. After 1935, it reverted to local status and continued to operate until 1951.) |

== See also ==
- Defunct North American collegiate sororities
- List of social sororities and women's fraternities
