= University of Miami Alma Mater =

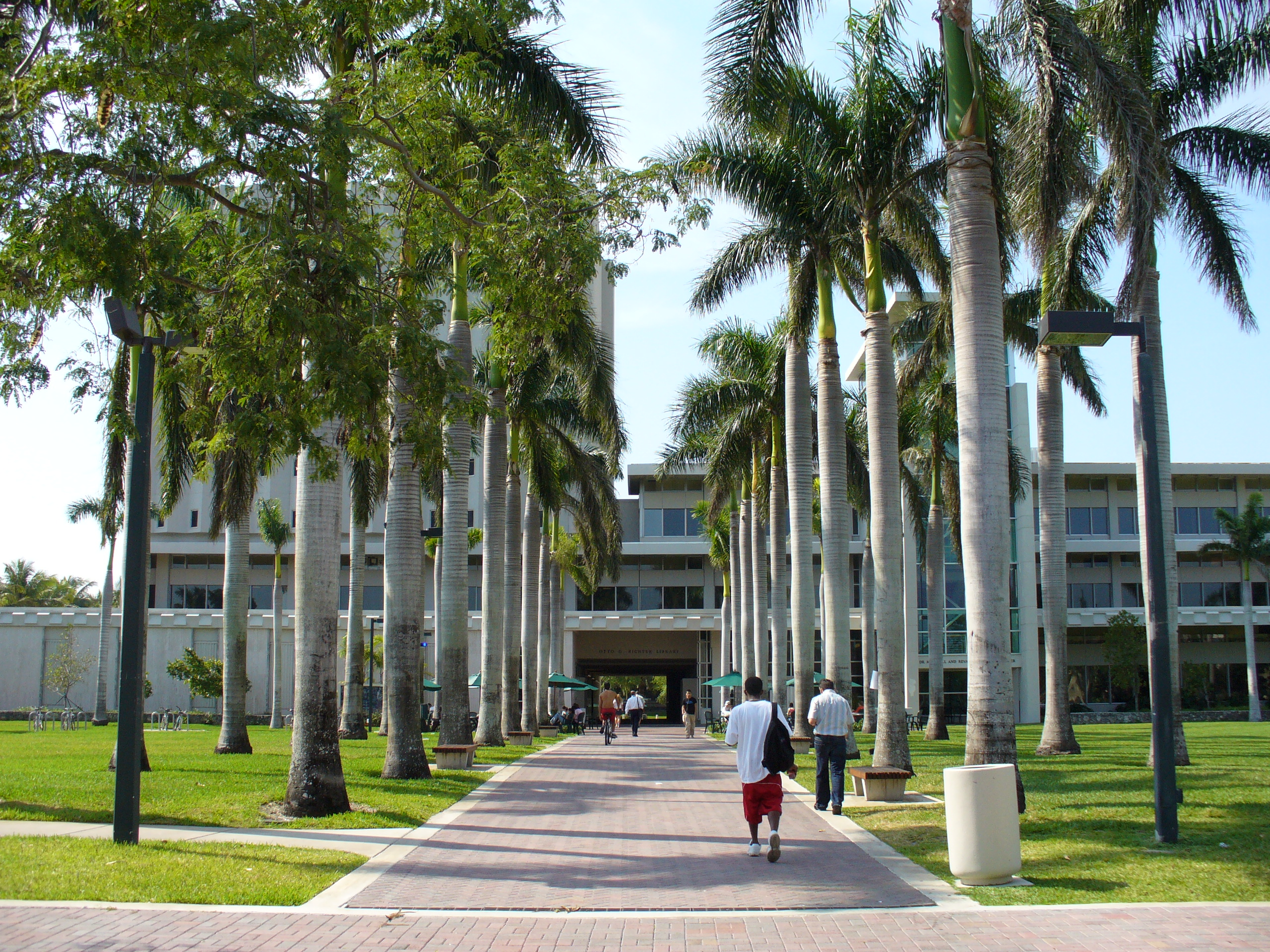
The University of Miami in Coral Gables, Florida

The University of Miami Alma Mater, titled Alma Mater: Stand Forever, is the official alma mater of the University of Miami in Coral Gables, Florida.

== History ==
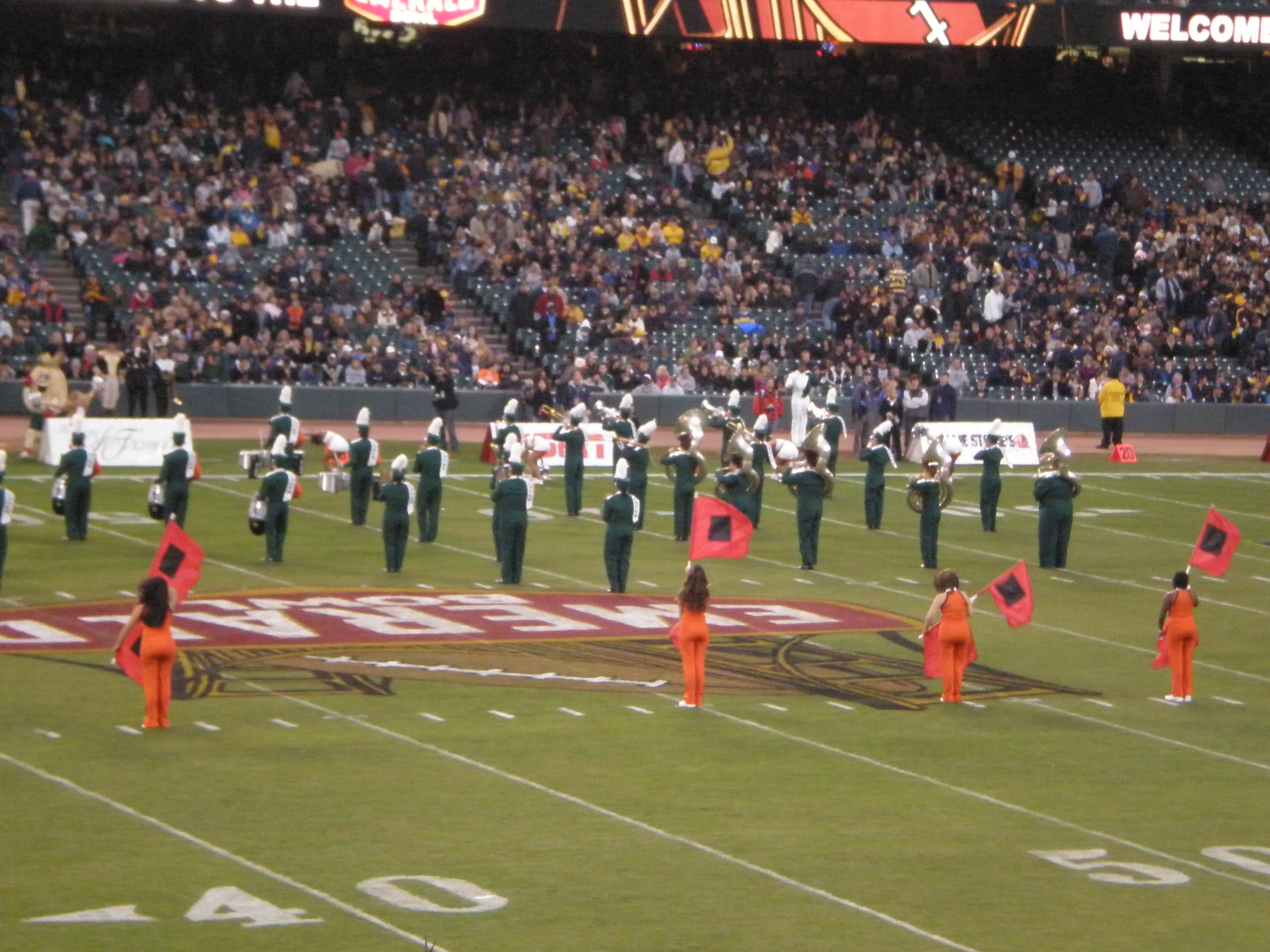
The Band of the Hour, the University of Miami student band

The words were written by William Seth Lampe, a newspaper reporter and public relations assistant to Bowman Foster Ashe, the first president of the University of Miami, with music by pianist Christine Asdurian, one of 646 students enrolled at the University of Miami in its first academic year of 1926–27.

Since then, the alma mater has been sung by fans at Miami Hurricanes sporting events, performed at University of Miami Commencement exercises, university presidential inaugurations, and performed at other major University of Miami events.

== Lyrics ==
Southern suns and sky blue water,
Smile upon you, Alma Mater;
Mistress of this fruitful land,
With all knowledge at your hand,
Always just, to honor true
All our love we pledge to you.
Alma Mater, Stand forever,
on Biscayne’s wondrous shore.
