= List of Kappa Alpha Theta chapters =

Kappa Alpha Theta is an international women's fraternity. In the following list, active chapters are indicated in bold and inactive chapters are indicated in italics.

Chapter	Charter date and range	Institution	City	State or province	Status	Ref.
**Alpha**	January 27, 1870	DePauw University	Greencastle	Indiana	Active	
**Beta**	May 18, 1870	Indiana University	Bloomington	Indiana	Active	
Cincinnati Wesleyan (see **Gamma deuteron**)	December 1, 1870 – 1871	Ohio Wesleyan Female College	Delaware	Ohio	Inactive; Reestablished	(Note: This school merged with Ohio Wesleyan University in 1877.)
Millersburg College	April 13, 1871 – 1872	Millersburg Female College	Millersburg	Kentucky	Inactive	(Note: Founded as the Millersburg Male and Female Collegiate Institute in 1856, it was renamed Millersburg Female College in 1860. This school was again renamed Millersburg College in 1915. In 1931 the institution was incorporated into Millersburg Military Institute, which used the building as an elementary school for its cadets. Millersburg Military Institute closed in 2006.)
Indiana Gamma	April 26, 1871 – 1874	Moores Hill (now University of Evansville)	Evansville	Indiana	Inactive	(Note: This school moved from Moores Hill to Evansville, Indiana in 1919, and was renamed that same year as Evansville College.)
**Gamma**	February 27, 1874 – 1886; 1906	Butler University	Indianapolis	Indiana	Active	(Note: Revived in 1906 from Sigma Alpha Theta, established in 1904.)
Delta 1	June 9, 1875 – 1895	Illinois Wesleyan University	Bloomington	Illinois	Inactive	(Note: Not to be confused with Delta chapter formed in 1895 at Illinois. As was the practice at that time, this name was reused.)
Epsilon	May 12, 1875 – 1913	College of Wooster	Wooster	Ohio	Inactive	(Note: Wooster's national Greeks were banned in 1913, but Theta's Epsilon chapter continued to thrive as a local organization first called the Imps, then as local sorority Zeta Phi Gamma, which still exists today. For many years, Kappa Alpha Theta HQ maintained a friendly correspondence with its former Epsilon chapter. The matter is explained more fully here: List of College of Wooster fraternities and sororities.)
Zeta	February 1, 1876 – 1886	Ohio University	Athens	Ohio	Inactive	
**Mu**	May 18, 1876 – 1876; 1881	Allegheny College	Meadville	Pennsylvania	Active	(Note: Revived in 1881 by absorbing the Pliades, established in 1878.)
**Eta**	December 10, 1879 – 1886; 1893–2016; 2026	University of Michigan	Ann Arbor	Michigan	Active	
Theta	June 9, 1880 – 1891	Simpson College	Indianola	Iowa	Inactive	(Note: Created by absorbing Theta Gamma Chi which was established in 1878.)
**Iota**	January 29, 1881 – 1965; 1980	Cornell University	Ithaca	New York	Active	(Note: Reformed as a colony in 1980.)
**Kappa**	March 18, 1881	University of Kansas	Lawrence	Kansas	Active	
**Lambda**	April 11, 1881 – 2005; 2010	University of Vermont	Burlington	Vermont	Active	(Note: Created by absorbing Alpha Rho, established in 1873. Reformed in 2010 by absorbing Kappa Beta Gamma, established sometime in the 2000s.)
**Gamma deuteron**	June 1, 1881 – 1882; 1924	Ohio Wesleyan University	Delaware	Ohio	Active	(Note: The Ohio Wesleyan chapter was first organized in 1878 as the Alpha chapter (founder) of Delta Chi Alpha, an early, non-NPC regional sorority. But within five years, that sorority disbanded; the founding group sought out and joined Kappa Alpha Theta in 1881. Noted in Baird's (1898).) (Note: Founded by absorbing the Alpha chapter of Delta Chi Alpha, established in 1878. It was reformed in 1924 by absorbing Delta Gamma Delta, established in 1922.)
**Nu**	January 4, 1882 – 1899; 1959	Hanover College	Hanover	Indiana	Active	(Note: Reformed as a colony in 1958.)
Xi	January 1, 1883 – 1887; 1989–2004	Wesleyan University	Middletown	Connecticut	Inactive	(Note: Created by absorbing Sigma Pi, established in 1881. Reformed as a colony in 1989.)
**Omicron**	March 3, 1887–October 1, 1895; April 14, 1917	University of Southern California	Los Angeles	California	Active	(Note: Reestablished by the adoption of the local sorority Alpha Rho, which had existed on the USC campus since 1895, as explained by historian Fran Becque in a Notable Sorority Women post from 16 Mar 2021, accessed 16 Mar 2021. Alpha Rho formed the same year the Omicron chapter failed, but this appears coincidental with no direct linkage between the two groups: In 1895 Omicron chapter had returned its charter "when enrollment decreased". In 1917, Alpha Rho accepted the invitation to revive the Omicron chapter and become a unit of Kappa Alpha Theta. Previously, this article indicated an 1870 installation year for the chapter, but this must have been an error as the school was founded in 1880.)
**Pi**	March 19, 1887 – 1908; March 5, 1955	Albion College	Albion	Michigan	Active	(Note: Formed by absorbing Sigma Theta, established in 1885. Reformed as a colony in 1954.)
**Rho**	April 7, 1887 – 1889; 1896	University of Nebraska–Lincoln	Lincoln	Nebraska	Active	
Sigma	May 1, 1887 – 1889; 1905–1941	University of Toronto	Toronto	Ontario	Inactive	(Note: Formed by absorbing the group Alpha, established in 1886. Re-established in 1905 by absorbing Delta Theta, established in 1902.)
**Tau**	September 29, 1887	Northwestern University	Evanston	Illinois	Active	
**Upsilon**	February 6, 1889 – 1891; 1892	University of Minnesota	Minneapolis–Saint Paul	Minnesota	Active	
**Phi**	April 4, 1889 – 1892; 1959	University of the Pacific	Stockton	California	Active	(Note: Reformed in 1959 by absorbing Delta Omicron Tau, established in 1881.)
**Chi**	October 10, 1889	Syracuse University	Syracuse	New York	Active	(Note: Formed by absorbing Kappa Delta Psi, established in 1888.)
**Psi**	May 29, 1890	University of Wisconsin–Madison	Madison	Wisconsin	Active	(Note: Formed by absorbing the group F. C., established in 1888.)
**Omega**	June 2, 1890	University of California, Berkeley	Berkeley	California	Active	(Note: Formed by absorbing Pi Sigma, established in 1890.)
**Alpha Beta**	September 24, 1891 – 1934; 2013	Swarthmore College	Swarthmore	Pennsylvania	Active,	(Note: Formed by absorbing Phi Delta Pi, established in 1890. Reformed in 2013 by absorbing Not Yet Sisters, established in 2012.)
**Phi deuteron**	February 4, 1892 – 1944; 1978	Stanford University	Stanford	California	Active	(Note: Reformed as a colony in 1978.)
**Alpha Gamma**	May 24, 1892	Ohio State University	Columbus	Ohio	Active	(Note: Formed by absorbing Alpha Gamma, established in 1891.)
Alpha Delta	May 15, 1896 – 1950	Goucher College	Towson	Maryland	Inactive	
**Delta**	May 9, 1895	University of Illinois Urbana-Champaign	Champaign	Illinois	Active	
**Alpha Epsilon**	February 20, 1897 – 1912; 1984	Brown University	Providence	Rhode Island	Active	(Note: Formed by absorbing Kappa Kappa Kappa, established in 1896. Reformed as a colony in 1984.)
Alpha Zeta	March 19, 1890 – 1915	Barnard College	Manhattan	New York	Inactive	
**Alpha Eta**	January 15, 1904	Vanderbilt University	Nashville	Tennessee	Active	(Note: Formed by absorbing Phi Kappa Upsilon, established in 1899.)
**Alpha Theta**	September 17, 1904	University of Texas at Austin	Austin	Texas	Active	(Note: Formed by absorbing Beta Epsilon, established in 1902.)
Alpha Iota	November 30, 1906 – 1973; 1987–2000	Washington University in St. Louis	St. Louis	Missouri	Inactive	(Note: Formed by absorbing Eta Epsilon Tau, established in 1898. Reformed as a colony in 1987.)
Alpha Kappa	June 5, 1907 – 1951	Adelphi University	Garden City	New York	Inactive	(Note: Formed by absorbing Phi Beta Psi, established in 190x ?.)
**Alpha Lambda**	May 21, 1908	University of Washington	Seattle	Washington	Active	(Note: Formed by absorbing Alpha Tau Delta, established in 1901.)
**Alpha Mu**	February 12, 1909	University of Missouri	Columbia	Missouri	Active	(Note: Formed by absorbing the local Delta Psi, established in 1906.)
**Alpha Nu**	July 16, 1909	University of Montana	Missoula	Montana	Active	(Note: Formed by absorbing Theta Phi, established in 1906.)
**Alpha Xi**	July 21, 1909 – 1997; 2011	University of Oregon	Eugene	Oregon	Active	(Note: Formed by absorbing Beta Epsilon, established in 1906. Revived as a colony in 2011.)
**Alpha Omicron**	August 25, 1909	University of Oklahoma	Norman	Oklahoma	Active	(Note: Formed by absorbing Eta Beta Pi, established in 1900.)
**Alpha Pi**	September 23, 1911	University of North Dakota	Grand Forks	North Dakota	Active	(Note: Formed by absorbing Alpha Delta, established in 1906.)
**Alpha Rho**	March 9, 1912	University of South Dakota	Vermillion	South Dakota	Active	(Note: Formed by absorbing the T.B.D. Club, established in 1897.)
**Alpha Sigma**	November 8, 1913	Washington State University	Pullman	Washington	Active	(Note: Formed by absorbing Pi Delta Phi, established in 1906.)
**Alpha Tau**	December 13, 1913	University of Cincinnati	Cincinnati	Ohio	Active	(Note: Formed by absorbing the V.C.P. Club, established in 1891.)
Alpha Upsilon	May 9, 1914 - 2014	Washburn University	Topeka	Kansas	Inactive	(Note: Formed by absorbing Sigma Delta Psi, established in 1905.)
**Alpha Phi**	May 16, 1914	Tulane University	New Orleans	Louisiana	Active	(Note: Formed by absorbing the Mu chapter of Phi Mu Gamma, established in 1910.)
**Alpha Chi**	May 22, 1915	Purdue University	West Lafayette	Indiana	Active	(Note: Formed by absorbing Phi Lambda Psi, established in 1905.)
**Alpha Psi**	October 2, 1915	Lawrence University	Appleton	Wisconsin	Active	(Note: Formed by absorbing Kappa Upsilon, established in 1903.)
Alpha Omega	December 4, 1915	University of Pittsburgh	Pittsburgh	Pennsylvania	Inactive	(Note: Formed by absorbing Pi Theta Nu, established in 1908.)
Beta Beta	May 6, 1916 – 1960	Randolph-Macon Woman's College	Lynchburg	Virginia	Inactive	(Note: Formed by absorbing Phi, established in 1915.) (Note: Not to be confused with Randolph–Macon College, the site of ΚΑΘ's Epsilon Omicron chapter.)
**Beta Gamma**	September 8, 1917 – 2006; 2014	Colorado State University	Fort Collins	Colorado	Active	(Note: Formed by absorbing Tau Epsilon Tau, established in 1904. Reformed as a colony in 2014.)
**Beta Delta**	September 15, 1917	University of Arizona	Tucson	Arizona	Active	(Note: Formed by absorbing Gamma Phi Sigma, established in 1905.)
**Beta Epsilon**	November 10, 1917	Oregon State University	Corvallis	Oregon	Active	(Note: Formed by absorbing Alpha Chi, established in 1914.)
**Beta Zeta**	September 5, 1919	Oklahoma State University–Stillwater	Stillwater	Oklahoma	Active	(Note: Formed by absorbing Alpha Theta, established in 1913.)
**Beta Eta**	November 1, 1919 – 1979; 1988	University of Pennsylvania	Philadelphia	Pennsylvania	Active	(Note: Formed by absorbing Lambda Iota, established in 1916. Reformed in 1988 by absorbing Nu Delta, established in 1987.)
**Beta Theta**	May 15, 1920 – 1986; 2001	University of Idaho	Moscow	Idaho	Active	(Note: Formed by absorbing Chi Delta Phi, established in 1915. Reformed as a colony in 2001.)
**Beta Iota**	April 23, 1921	University of Colorado Boulder	Boulder	Colorado	Active	(Note: Formed by absorbing Delta Chi Zeta, established in 1919.)
**Beta Kappa**	April 30, 1921	Drake University	Des Moines	Iowa	Active	(Note: Formed by absorbing Beta Chi Upsilon, established in 1907.)
**Beta Lambda**	April 29, 1922	College of William & Mary	Williamsburg	Virginia	Active	(Note: Formed by absorbing Gamma Omega, established in 1920.)
**Beta Mu**	November 18, 1922	University of Nevada, Reno	Reno	Nevada	Active	(Note: Formed by absorbing Delta Kappa Tau, established in 1917.)
**Beta Nu**	October 18, 1924	Florida State University	Tallahassee	Florida	Active	(Note: Formed by absorbing Alpha Theta, established in 1922.)
**Beta Xi**	June 15, 1925	University of California, Los Angeles	Los Angeles	California	Active	(Note: Formed by absorbing Sigma Alpha Kappa, established in 1919.)
**Beta Omicron**	June 9, 1926	University of Iowa	Iowa City	Iowa	Active	(Note: Established as a colony in 1926.)
**Beta Pi**	June 12, 1926	Michigan State University	East Lansing	Michigan	Active	(Note: Formed by absorbing Sororian, established in 1901.)
**Beta Rho**	February 18, 1928	Duke University	Durham	North Carolina	Active	(Note: Formed by absorbing Sigma Taue, established in 1924.)
Beta Sigma	March 9, 1929 – July 2022	Southern Methodist University	Dallas	Texas	Inactive	(Note: Established as a colony in 1928.)
**Beta Tau**	June 15, 1929	Denison University	Granville	Ohio	Active	(Note: Formed by absorbing Chi Psi Delta, established in 1900.)
**Beta Upsilon**	February 15, 1930 – 1980; 2003	University of British Columbia	Kelowna	British Columbia	Active	(Note: Formed by absorbing Sigma Beta Phi, established in 1926. Reformed as a colony in 2003.)
**Beta Phi**	May 30, 1931	Pennsylvania State University	University Park	Pennsylvania	Active	(Note: Formed by absorbing Nita Ni, established in 1922.)
**Beta Chi**	September 26, 1931	University of Alberta	Alberta	Alberta	Active	(Note: Formed by absorbing Phi Omega, established in 1921.)
**Beta Psi**	February 27, 1932	McGill University	Montreal	Quebec	Active	
**Beta Omega**	September 2, 1932	Colorado College	Colorado Springs	Colorado	Active	(Note: Formed by absorbing the Contemporary Club, established in 1899.)
Gamma Gamma	January 27, 1933 – 2000	Rollins College	Winter Park	Florida	Inactive	(Note: Established as a colony in 1932.)
**Gamma Delta**	March 6, 1937	University of Georgia	Athens	Georgia	Active	(Note: Formed by absorbing Alpha Theta, established in 1931.)
**Gamma Epsilon**	September 18, 1937	University of Western Ontario	London	Ontario	Active	(Note: Formed by absorbing Sigma Pi, established in 1927.)
**Gamma Zeta**	October 3, 1942 – 1971; 1979	University of Connecticut	Storrs	Connecticut	Active	(Note: Formed by absorbing Gamma Sigma, established in 1928. Reformed as a colony in 1978.)
Gamma Eta	February 6, 1943 – 1979	University of Massachusetts Amherst	Amherst	Massachusetts	Inactive	(Note: Formed by absorbing Phi Zeta, established in 1932.)
**Gamma Theta**	April 29, 1944	Carnegie Mellon University	Pittsburgh	Pennsylvania	Active	(Note: Formed by absorbing Beta Tau Lambda, established in 1920.)
**Gamma Iota**	October 29, 1945	University of Kentucky	Lexington	Kentucky	Active	(Note: Established as a colony in 1945.)
**Gamma Kappa**	November 9, 1946 – 1975; 2017	George Washington University	Washington	District of Columbia	Active	
**Gamma Mu**	February 14, 1947	University of Maryland, College Park	College Park	Maryland	Active	(Note: Established as a colony in 1946.)
Gamma Lambda	March 1, 1947 – 1970	Beloit College	Beloit	Wisconsin	Inactive	
**Gamma Nu**	June 19, 1947	North Dakota State University	Fargo	North Dakota	Active	(Note: Formed by absorbing Beta Xi, established in 1914.)
Gamma Xi	February 6, 1948 – 1975	San Jose State University	San Jose	California	Inactive	(Note: Formed by absorbing Sappho, established in 1898.)
Gamma Omicron	March 13, 1948 – 1978	University of New Mexico	Albuquerque	New Mexico	Inactive	(Note: Established as a colony in 1947.)
**Gamma Pi**	May 8, 1948	Iowa State University	Ames	Iowa	Active	
**Gamma Rho**	January 29, 1950	University of California, Santa Barbara	Santa Barbara	California	Active	(Note: Formed by absorbing Alpha Theta Chi, established in 1924.)
**Gamma Sigma**	January 26, 1951 – 2011; 2016	San Diego State University	San Diego	California	Active	(Note: Formed by absorbing Chi Theta, established in 1928. Revived as a colony in 2016.)
**Gamma Tau**	February 23, 1951	University of Tulsa	Tulsa	Oklahoma	Active	(Note: Formed by absorbing Theta Theta Theta, established in 1949.)
**Gamma Upsilon**	April 14, 1951	Miami University	Oxford	Ohio	Active	(Note: Formed by absorbing Alpha Kappa Epsilon, established in 1950.)
**Gamma Phi**	April 25, 1953	Texas Tech University	Lubbock	Texas	Active	(Note: Formed by absorbing San Souci, established in 1926.)
**Gamma Chi**	May 23, 1953	California State University, Fresno	Fresno	California	Active	(Note: Formed by absorbing Alpha Theta, established in 1921.)
**Gamma Psi**	May 15, 1955	Texas Christian University	Fort Worth	Texas	Active	(Note: Established as a colony in 1955.)
**Gamma Omega**	January 26, 1957 – 2000; 2009	Auburn University	Auburn	Alabama	Active	(Note: Formed as a colony in 1956. Revived as a colony in 2009.)
**Delta Delta**	March 16, 1957	Whitman College	Walla Walla	Washington	Active	(Note: Established as a colony in 1957.)
**Delta Epsilon**	April 11, 1959	Arizona State University	Tempe	Arizona	Active	(Note: Established as a colony in 1958.)
**Delta Zeta**	May 9, 1959	Emory University	Atlanta	Georgia	Active	(Note: Formed by absorbing Lite, established in 1953.)
**Delta Eta**	May 13, 1961	Kansas State University	Manhattan	Kansas	Active	(Note: Established as a colony in 1960.)
**Delta Theta**	April 28, 1962	University of Florida	Gainesville	Florida	Active	(Note: Established as a colony in 1961.)
**Delta Iota**	February 23, 1963	University of Puget Sound	Puget Sound	Washington	Active	(Note: Established as a colony in 1962.)
**Delta Kappa**	March 23, 1963	Louisiana State University	Baton Rouge	Louisiana	Active	
Delta Lambda	January 23, 1965 – 1988	University of Utah	Salt Lake City	Utah	Inactive	(Note: Established as a colony in 1964.)
Delta Mu	November 6, 1965 – 1973	University of Rhode Island	Kingston	Rhode Island	Inactive	
Delta Nu	October 29, 1966 – 1989	University of Arkansas	Fayetteville	Arkansas	Inactive	(Note: Established as a colony in 1966.)
Delta Xi	December 3, 1966 – 1991	University of North Carolina at Chapel Hill	Chapel Hill	North Carolina	Inactive	
**Delta Omicron**	March 1967	University of Alabama	Tuscaloosa	Alabama	Active	
Delta Pi	March 1, 1969 – 1985	University of Tennessee	Knoxville	Tennessee	Inactive	(Note: Established as a colony in 1968.)
Delta Rho	June 19, 1969 – 1980	University of South Florida	Tampa	Florida	Inactive	(Note: Formed by absorbing Tri Chi, established in 1957.)
Delta Sigma	September 26, 1970	Ball State University	Muncie	Indiana	Inactive	(Note: Formed by absorbing Kappa Theta Rho, established in 1967.)
Delta Tau	January 24, 1971 – 1983	Montana State University	Bozeman	Montana	Inactive	(Note: Established as a colony in 1970.)
**Delta Upsilon**	March 4, 1972	Eastern Kentucky University	Richmond	Kentucky	Active	(Note: Formed by absorbing Kappa Phi Delta, established in 1968.)
Delta Phi	November 18, 1972 – 2019	Clemson University	Clemson	South Carolina	Inactive	(Note: Established as a colony in 1972.)
Delta Psi	January 24, 1976 – 1998	University of California, Riverside	Riverside	California	Inactive	(Note: Established as a colony in 1974.)
**Delta Omega**	February 7, 1976	Texas A&M University	College Station	Texas	Active	(Note: Established as a colony in 1975.)
**Epsilon Epsilon**	March 20, 1976	Baylor University	Waco	Texas	Active	(Note: Formed by absorbing Delta Alpha Pi, established in 1935.)
**Delta Chi**	April 3, 1976	University of Virginia	Charlottesville	Virginia	Active	
Epsilon Zeta	February 24, 1979 – 2018	University of Mississippi	Oxford	Mississippi	Inactive	(Note: Established as a colony in 1978.)
**Epsilon Eta**	October 4, 1980	Centre College	Danville	Kentucky	Active	(Note: Established as a colony in 1980.)
**Epsilon Theta**	May 2, 1981 – 1993; 2016	Stetson University	DeLand	Florida	Active	(Note: Established as a colony in 1981. Reformed as a colony in 2016.)
**Epsilon Iota**	February 20, 1982	Westminster College	Fulton	Missouri	Active	(Note: Established as a colony in 1981.)
Epsilon Kappa	February 27, 1982 – 1992	Dartmouth College	Hanover	New Hampshire	Inactive	(Note: Formed by absorbing C.O.N.S., established in 198x ?.) (Note: Many of Dartmouth's Greek chapters have reverted to local status, as was the case with Theta's Epsilon Kappa chapter. See Dartmouth College Greek organizations#Epsilon Kappa Theta (ΕΚΘ) for additional information. The existing local has no legal connection with the national sorority.)
**Epsilon Lambda**	November 20, 1982	Dickinson College	Carlisle	Pennsylvania	Active	(Note: Established as a colony in 1982.)
**Epsilon Mu**	March 26, 1983	Princeton University	Princeton	New Jersey	Active	
**Epsilon Nu**	October 30, 1983 – 2003; 2017	Virginia Tech	Blackburg	Virginia	Active	(Note: Formed as a colony in 1983. Revived as a colony in 2017.)
Epsilon Xi	November 19, 1983 – 1994	Villanova University	Villanova	Pennsylvania	Inactive	(Note: Established as a colony in 1983.)
**Epsilon Omicron**	April 7, 1984	Randolph-Macon College	Ashland	Virginia	Active	**(Note: Not to be confused with Randolph College, the location of ΚΑΘ's former Beta Beta chapter.)**
**Epsilon Pi**	November 17, 1984	Bucknell University	Lewisburg	Pennsylvania	Active	(Note: Established as a colony in 1984.)
**Epsilon Rho**	November 8, 1984	Lehigh University	Bethlehem	Pennsylvania	Active	
**Epsilon Sigma**	May 18, 1985	University of California, Irvine	Irvine	California	Active	(Note: Established as a colony in 1985.)
**Epsilon Tau**	January 25, 1986	Yale University	New Haven	Connecticut	Active	
**Epsilon Upsilon**	October 18, 1986	Columbia University	New York City	New York	Active	(Note: Established as a colony in 1986.)
**Epsilon Phi**	November 8, 1986	University of Chicago	Chicago	Illinois	Active	
Epsilon Chi	February 7, 1987 – 1998	University of Guelph	Guelph	Ontario	Inactive	(Note: Formed by absorbing Guelph Girls Group, established in 1986.)
**Epsilon Psi**	May 3, 1987	University of Richmond	Richmond	Virginia	Active	(Note: Established as a colony in 1987.)
**Epsilon Omega**	April 9, 1988	Washington & Jefferson College	Washington	Pennsylvania	Active	
Zeta Zeta	May 8, 1988 – 2008	Colgate University	Hamilton	New York	Inactive	(Note: Formed by absorbing Alpha Theta Pi, established in 1984.)
**Zeta Theta**	January 29, 1989	California Polytechnic State University, San Luis Obispo	San Luis Obispo County	California	Active	(Note: Established as a colony in 1988.)
**Zeta Eta**	February 11, 1989	Wofford College	Spartanburg	South Carolina	Active	(Note: Formed by absorbing Pi Delphians, established in 198x ?.)
**Zeta Iota**	May 6, 1989	Washington & Lee University	Lexington	Virginia	Active	(Note: Established as a colony in 1989.)
**Zeta Kappa**	January 27, 1990 – 2001; 2025	University of South Carolina	Columbia	South Carolina	Active	
**Zeta Lambda**	March 24, 1990	College of Charleston	Charleston	South Carolina	Active	
**Zeta Mu**	February 9, 1991	Massachusetts Institute of Technology	Cambridge	Massachusetts	Active	(Note: Established as a colony in 1990.)
**Zeta Nu**	April 10, 1992	University of California, Davis	Davis	California	Active	(Note: Formed by absorbing Beta Kappa Pi, established in 1984.)
**Zeta Xi**	January 30, 1993 – 2019; 2022	Harvard University	Cambridge	Massachusetts	Active	(Note: Established as a colony in 1992. Reformed as a colony in 2022.)
**Zeta Omicron**	November 13, 1993 – 2002; 2013	Wake Forest University	Winston-Salem	North Carolina	Active	(Note: Formed by absorbing Thymes Society, established in 1968. Reformed as a colony in 2013.)
Zeta Pi	February 12, 1994 – 1996	Furman University	Greenville	South Carolina	Inactive	(Note: Formed by absorbing Theta, established in 1981.)
**Zeta Rho**	February 12, 1994	University of California, San Diego	San Diego	California	Active	(Note: Established as a colony in 1994.)
**Zeta Sigma**	April 23, 1994	Ohio Northern University	Ada	Ohio	Active	(Note: Established as a colony in 1993.)
**Zeta Tau**	November 4, 1995	University of Delaware	Newark	Delaware	Active	(Note: Established as a colony in 1995.)
**Zeta Upsilon**	March 9, 1996	University of Texas at Dallas	Dallas	Texas	Active	(Note: Formed by absorbing Beta Chi, established in 1995.)
**Zeta Phi**	February 1, 1997	Pepperdine University	Malibu	California	Active	(Note: Formed by absorbing Theta Alpha Phi, established in 1973.)
**Zeta Chi**	April 20, 1997 – 2009; 2013	Johns Hopkins University	Baltimore	Maryland	Active	(Note: Formed by absorbing Pi Sigma Alpha, established in 1993. Reformed as a colony in 2014.)
Zeta Psi	November 21, 1998–September 12, 2008	University of Southern Mississippi	Hattiesburg	Mississippi	Inactive	(Note: Established as a colony in 1998.)
**Zeta Omega**	March 11, 2000	Loyola Marymount University	Los Angeles	California	Active	(Note: Established as a colony in 1999.)
**Eta Eta**	October 15, 2000	College of Idaho	Caldwell	Idaho	Active	(Note: Formed by absorbing Theta Theta Theta which was established in 1960.)
**Eta Theta**	November 18, 2000	University of Central Florida	Orlando	Florida	Active	(Note: Established as a colony in 2000.)
**Eta Iota**	March 4, 2001	University of San Diego	San Diego	California	Active	(Note: Established as a colony in 2001.)
**Eta Kappa**	November 18, 2001	John Carroll University	University Heights	Ohio	Active	(Note: Formed by absorbing Pi Sigma Phi, established in 1991.)
**Eta Lambda**	November 16, 2003	Santa Clara University	Santa Clara	California	Active	(Note: Established as a colony in 2003.)
Eta Mu	November 6, 2004–February 18, 2022	Occidental College	Los Angeles	California	Inactive	(Note: Established as a colony in 2004.)
Eta Nu	November 20, 2004–December 12, 2022	Lake Forest College	Lake Forest	Illinois	Inactive	(Note: Formed by absorbing Alpha Pi Delta, established in 1961.)
**Eta Xi**	November 4, 2006	Quinnipiac University	Hamden	Connecticut	Active	(Note: Established as a colony in 2006.)
Eta Omicron	April 22, 2007–July 19, 2022	University of North Florida	Jacksonville	Florida	Inactive	(Note: Established as a colony in 2007.)
**Eta Pi**	November 18, 2007	Case Western Reserve University	Cleveland	Ohio	Active	
**Eta Rho**	December 2, 2007	James Madison University	Harrisonburg	Virginia	Active	
**Eta Sigma**	April 20, 2008	Chapman University	Orange	California	Active	(Note: Established as a colony in 2008.)
**Eta Tau**	November 7, 2010	University of Tampa	Tampa	Florida	Active	(Note: Established as a colony in 2010.)
**Eta Upsilon**	October 23, 2011	University of San Francisco	San Francisco	California	Active	(Note: Established as a colony in 2011.)
**Eta Phi**	November 6, 2011	Belmont University	Nashville	Tennessee	Active	
**Eta Chi**	December 2, 2012	Boston University	Boston	Massachusetts	Active	(Note: Established as a colony in 2012.)
**Eta Psi**	November 2, 2013	Tufts University	Medford and Somerville	Massachusetts	Active	(Note: Established as a colony in 2013.)
**Eta Omega**	November 9, 2013	Saint Louis University	St. Louis	Missouri	Active	
**Theta Theta**	November 23, 2013	North Carolina State University	Raleigh	North Carolina	Active	
**Theta Iota**	January 14, 2014	Georgetown University	Washington	District of Columbia	Active	(Note: Established as a colony in 2014.)
**Theta Kappa**	November 9, 2014	University of Louisville	Louisville	Kentucky	Active	
Theta Lambda	November 14, 2015–April 26, 2023	University of Rochester	Rochester	New York	Inactive	(Note: Established as a colony in 2015.)
**Theta Mu**	November 5, 2016	Colorado School of Mines	Golden	Colorado	Active	(Note: Established as a colony in 2016.)
**Theta Nu**	November 12, 2016	Georgia Institute of Technology	Atlanta	Georgia	Active	
**Theta Xi**	January 28, 2017	University of California, Santa Cruz	Santa Cruz	California	Active	
**Theta Omicron**	November 11, 2017	University of North Carolina at Charlotte	Charlotte	North Carolina	Active	(Note: Established as a colony in 2017.)
**Theta Pi**	November 18, 2017	Sacred Heart University	Fairfield	Connecticut	Active	
