= Gary Dunn =

American football player (born 1953)

No. 67
- Position: Defensive tackle

Personal information
- Born: August 24, 1953 (age 73); Coral Gables, Florida, U.S.
- Listed height: 6 ft 4 in (1.93 m)
- Listed weight: 258 lb (117 kg)

Career information
- High school: Coral Gables Senior
- College: Miami (FL)
- NFL draft: 1976: 6th round, 159th overall pick

Career history
- Pittsburgh Steelers (1976–1987)

Awards and highlights
- 2× Super Bowl champion (XIII, XIV); Second-team All-Pro (1984)

Career NFL statistics
- Sacks: 18
- Games played: 146
- Games started: 105
- Fumble recoveries: 9
- Stats at Pro Football Reference

Gary Edward Dunn (born August 24, 1953) is an American former professional football player who was a defensive tackle for 12 seasons with the Pittsburgh Steelers of the National Football League (NFL). He played college football for the Miami Hurricanes.

== Early life ==
Gary Dunn was born August 24, 1953, in Coral Gables, Florida. His grandfather was Bowman Foster Ashe, the first president of the University of Miami. Dunn attended Coral Gables Senior High School in Coral Gables.

== College career ==
Dunn attended the University of Miami, where he was a standout college football player for the Hurricanes.

== Professional career ==
In 1976, Dunn was selected in the sixth round with the 159th overal pick by the Pittsburgh Steelers, where he was a mainstay on the vaunted Steelers' defense for 12 seasons, serving as team captain four years. While with the Steelers, he was a two-time Super Bowl champion and had 18 career sacks, including of such legendary Pro Football Hall of Fame quarterbacks as Joe Namath, Bob Griese and Jim Kelly.

After missing 10 starts in the 1985 season, Dunn underwent knee surgery twice during the off season. In the 1986 season, he recovered and started all 16 games and had 49 tackles.

== Personal ==
Gary Dunn is the grandson of Bowman Foster Ashe, the first president of the University of Miami, and he and his wife Caron live in Tavernier, Florida, with their two children, Iris and Eddie. They own Oceanview Inn and Pub in Islamorada, Florida.
