= Band of the Hour =

Marching band of the University of Miami

Frost Band of the Hour
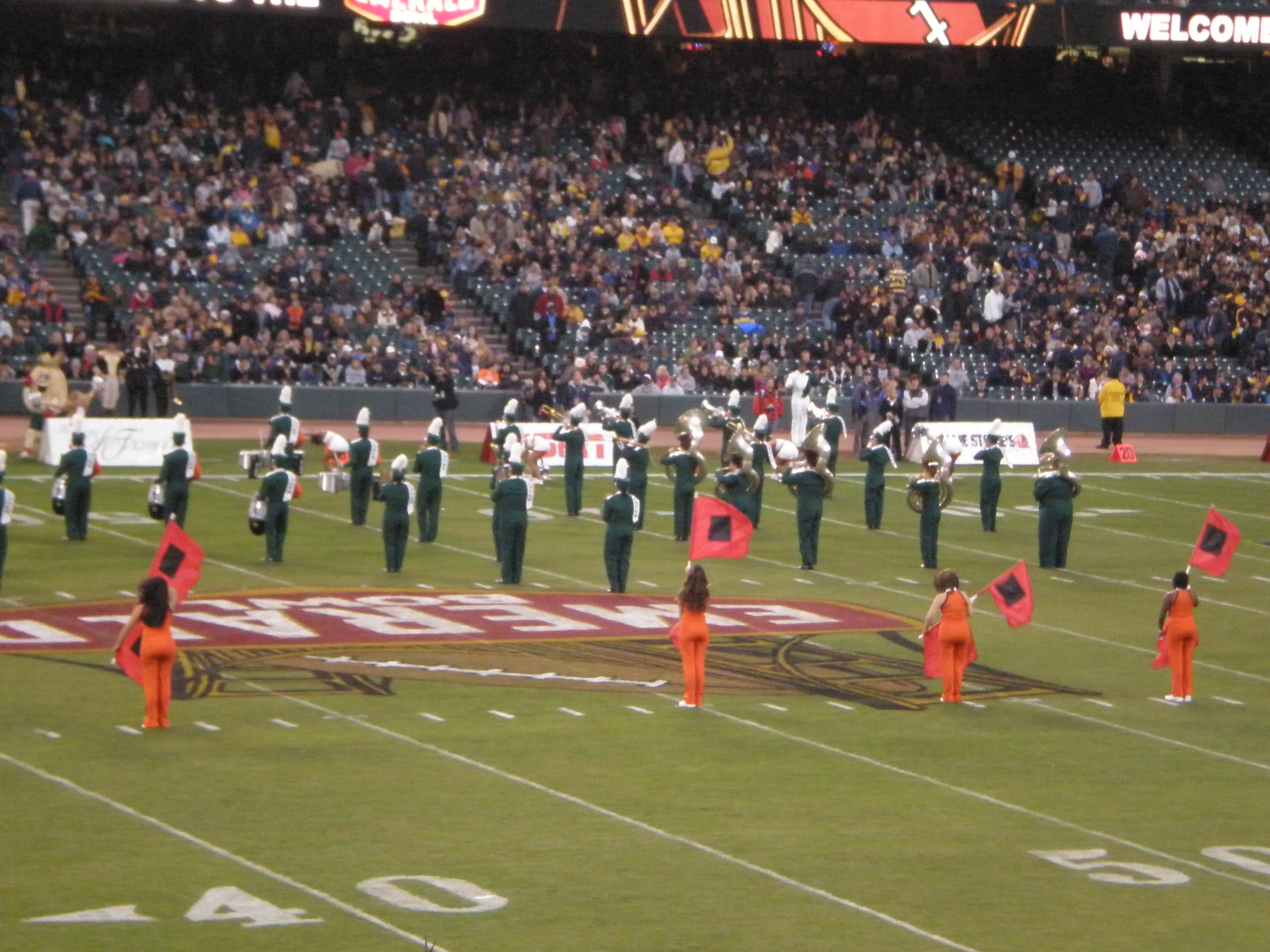
- The Frost Band of the Hour, the marching band of the University of Miami, performing at the 2008 Emerald Bowl in San Francisco
- School: University of Miami
- Location: Coral Gables, Florida, U.S.
- Conference: ACC
- Founded: 1933
- Director: Dr. Craig S. McKenzie
- Assistant Director: Dr. Sheldon A. McLean
- Members: 179
- Fight song: "Miami U"
- Website: bandofthehour.miami.edu

The Frost Band of the Hour, sometimes abbreviated as simply Band of the Hour, or FBOTH, is the marching band at the University of Miami in Coral Gables, Florida.

The band plays at all home Miami Hurricanes football games and selected away games. It also travels to post-season football bowl games in years that the football team plays at one. The band's name originated during the 1946 Orange Bowl halftime show, when Henry Fillmore announced that the "Man of The Hour" march was being played by the "Band of the Hour". The band decided to keep the name.

The "Frost" part of the marching band's name comes from ardent music lover and philanthropists Dr. Phillip and Patricia Frost, who gave a $33 million gift to the University of Miami's School of Music in 2003. At the time this was the largest gift ever given to an American university-based music school. This generous donation led to UM's school of music to rebrand itself as the Frost School of Music, which in turn the Band of the Hour adopted said name.

The band was founded in 1933 by Walter E. Shaeffer, who had served with the United States Marine Band as a musician and concertmaster. During the 1950s, composer Henry Fillmore became a major patron of the band. He provided funding for the construction of Henry Fillmore Band Hall, the band's home base.

Fred McCall was director of bands from 1948 until 1971 when he became director emeritus. William B. Russell was director of bands from 1972 to 1991. Michael Mann served as the band's director as well as associate director of bands from 1991 to 2000. In 1993, Gary D. Green took office. Michael B. Dressman was director of the Band of the Hour from 2000 to 2004. C. David Ragsdale served as interim director in 2004–2005. Phillip Clements was associate director of bands and director of the Band of the Hour until the summer of 2008 when Thomas Keck became director of the Band of the Hour and associate director of bands. Charles Damon is the assistant director of programs.

Under Keck's administration, the band began to focus on the music it played in the stands. Emphasis was placed on popular music since many home-grown members had come from high schools that followed the marching traditions of historically black colleges. In an attempt to play to South Florida's significant Hispanic culture, the band also began playing more Latin music both in the stands and during field shows.

Keck set a goal of increasing the band's size to 200, and the band has increased. In September 2009, band membership reached 179, due in part to bringing in members of the Florida International University's marching band, which was dissolved that year due to budget cuts, though FIU's band would again return in 2010. The band also includes students from Miami Dade College and other schools. In 2009, Mario Cruz set a record of playing with the band for 10 years.

In Fall 2014, Jay Rees took over as the director of the Band of the Hour and director of athletic bands at the University of Miami. Under the direction of Professor Jay C. Rees, nationally recognized for his progressive approach and cutting-edge style, the Frost Band of the Hour became an ensemble of student members from all fields of study, performing challenging custom musical arrangements and contemporary, drum corps-style drill design. Since 2014, the band has sought a new vision of professionalism and excellence. Some marching band shows performed under Rees include music from artists such as Daft Punk, Rihanna, and Gloria Estefan.

Since 1993, the Band of the Hour is supported by the Band of the Hour Association, an alumni group. The association maintains a hall of fame for the band. Alumni also play or march with the band during homecoming football games.

== See also ==
- University of Miami Alma Mater
