= Bertha Foster =

American academic (1881–1968)

Bertha Mae Foster (May 3, 1881 – February 29, 1968) was a founding regent of the University of Miami in Coral Gables, Florida, and served on its board of trustees from 1925 to 1941. She was appointed its first dean of music in 1926 by the university's first president, Bowman F. Ashe, and served as dean of its School of Music for 18 years until her retirement in 1944. The University of Miami awarded Bertha Foster an honorary doctor of musical arts (D.M.A.) in 1951.

== Early life ==
Foster was born May 3, 1881, in Marshfield, Indiana, to Annie B. Foster and William Alvin Foster, an attorney and a judge who later became the first mayor of South Miami. She was raised in St. Paul, Minnesota, and wrote her first song at age 4. She had one sister, Edith A. Foster, and a brother, Alvin E. Foster.

She was a graduate of the College of Music of Cincinnati and a pupil of organist William Wolstenholme in London, England.

== Career ==
Foster began her career as a professor of music from 1908 to 1910 at Florida State College for Women (later renamed Florida State University at Tallahassee).

She moved to Jacksonville, Florida, in 1910, where she founded and operated the School of Musical Art for 11 years. Composer Ruth Seeger Crawford was one of Foster's private piano students in 1913. Foster was also organist at Temple Ahaveth Chesed and First Christian Church in Jacksonville. She traveled to Europe in 1918 to perform for WWI military troops with YMCA Entertainment.

By the early 1920s, Foster was widely known in Florida as an accomplished organist, pianist, choir director, and successful music education administrator. She relocated to Miami at the urging of city developer George E. Merrick and established the Miami Conservatory of Music in 1921. It offered private lessons in piano, violin, music theory and more. She was also organist and choir director of the Trinity Methodist Episcopal Church Choir in Miami, director of the Aeolian Chorus and helped to organize the Miami Music Clubs and the Miami Music Festival in 1924. She was a tireless advocate for public music education, and the ways that music could help build the cultural life in Miami. She was a founding member of the Florida Federation of Music Clubs and became the second president of the organization in 1924.

After Foster relocated to Miami, her sister Edith Ann Foster Meekins operated the School of Musical Art in Jacksonville. Her mother Annie Foster helped her manage the Miami Conservatory of Music. Soon after her arrival in Miami, Foster was also tapped to help establish a conservatory of music at the University of Miami, which became the School of Music in 1926. She was appointed its first dean and mentored Christine Asdurian. Christine Asdurian is one of UM's(University of Miami) "Alma Mater" writers.

Despite a major hurricane that caused widespread damage in Miami on September 17, 1926, Foster and 22 music faculty members and 25 college music majors began classes one month later on October 15, 1926, in the Anastasia Hotel which became the temporary home of the University of Miami. Faculty included symphonic conductor Arnold Volpe and choral conductor Robert E. Olmstead, plus three piano professors, two in music education, two in voice, and one in cello. From the very beginning they offered programs in applied music, music history, music theory, and music education, and conducted a men's glee club, women's glee club, and the University of Miami Symphony Orchestra. Walter E. Scheaffer became the founding director of the first University of Miami Band in 1933.

While leading the University of Miami School of Music through the Great Depression and into an era of growth and prosperity, Foster also opened the doors to a new Musicians Club of America in 1939, a residential home for retired musicians first located at 303 Minorca Avenue in Coral Gables, then at 1564 Brickell Avenue in Miami.

After her own retirement from the University of Miami in 1944, Foster continued to organize concerts, host musicales, perform organ recitals, and was organist and choir director at All Soul's Church.

The Miami Conservatory of Music continued to flourish, and had six locations in the Greater Miami region by the 1950s.

== Awards ==
The University of Miami awarded Foster an honorary doctor of musical arts (D.M.A.) in 1951.

In 1952, the members of the Upsilon Delta chapter of Chi Omega presented Foster with the first Bertha Foster Award of the Chi Omega Alumnae, created to honor woman who “contributed to and encouraged cultural development.” Foster was one of the first faculty members of the Upsilon Delta chapter of Chi Omega founded on December 17, 1936, the first national fraternity for women to come to the University of Miami.

In 1959, the cities of Miami, Miami Beach, and Coral Gables officially honored Foster with a weeklong tri-city music festival for her “30 years of distinguished service to the cultural and musical development of this community.”

The Bertha Foster Scholarship for Music Performance is awarded annually to a deserving music student at the University of Miami's Frost School of Music, and the Bertha Foster Memorial Music Building with student practice rooms is located in the Frost School's music quad.

== Personal life ==
Foster died in Broward County, Florida, on February 29, 1968, at the age of 86. She was survived by her sister Edith Foster Meekins, nephews Col. Robert C. Foster, Edward T. Foster and William M. Foster, and niece Betty Jane Foster Deadwyler.
