= Beta Phi Alpha =

Defunct American collegiate sorority

- ΒΦΑ
- Founded: May 8, 1909; 117 years ago University of California, Berkeley
- Type: Social
- Former affiliation: NPC
- Status: Merged
- Merge date: June 22, 1941
- Successor: Delta Zeta
- Scope: National
- Motto: Scientia, Virtus, Amicitia "Knowledge, Virtue, Friendship"
- Colors: Kelly green and Gold
- Publication: Aldebaran
- Chapters: 35
- Members: 3,295 lifetime
- Headquarters: United States

Beta Phi Alpha (ΒΦΑ) was an American collegiate sorority. It was formed at the University of California, Berkeley in 1919. It was absorbed by Delta Zeta in 1941.

== History ==
The group had a succession of names. Founded on the campus of the University of California, Berkeley on May 8, 1909, Beta Phi Alpha began as Bid-A-Wee, a group created to meet the needs of a "very difficult housing situation". Through future name changes, the fraternity continued to count its Founders Day as 8 May 1909. The founders were Edith May Harriman, Elsa Erva Meta Ludeke, Anna Belle Nelson, Hattie Belle Paul, Ida Luise Rinn, and Lydia Maude Taylor.

In 1912, the name changed to Aldebaran, after the star. This change, and an expanded symbolism, mark the point where interest began among members for expansion to other campus groups.

On November 24, 1919, the group chose to rename itself as a Greek letter organization with the name Kappa Phi Alpha. But within a year, discovering that a men's fraternity in Boston had been operating under those letters, in 1920, the sorority took on its final name, Beta Phi Alpha. The 1919 date appears to be the juncture where the group, now solidly interested in connecting with other campus organizations, began to establish structures that would aid such growth. This process was led by Mary Gordon Holway, who wrote the ritual and advocated for a Greek letter identity.

Beta Phi Alpha then began the process of nationalization and expansion. On October 18, 1923, it was granted membership in the National Panhellenic Conference. Expansion was often effected by the absorption of local chapters or restless chapters of struggling non-NPC sororities. One of these was a five-year-old local at the University of Minnesota called Zeta Alpha that became the Kappa chapter of Beta Phi Alpha in 1927. A total of 35 chapters were installed by 1936, but only a portion of them survived due to the economic downturn of the Great Depression. For example, in 1936, two of the six chapters of a small national sorority called Phi Delta affiliated with Beta Phi Alpha, creating chapters at New York University and George Washington University. However, it appears these did not survive, as five years later they were not reflected in the final chapter list at the time of merger with Delta Zeta.

On June 22, 1941, Beta Phi Alpha joined in a friendly merger with Delta Zeta sorority. Delta Zeta gained eight undergraduate chapters from the merger. At the time of the merger, Beta Phi Alpha had chartered thirty chapters with 3,295 initiates.

Beta Phi Alpha's Convention Lights is still sung at the close of Delta Zeta national conventions. The gavel that opens Delta Zeta's convention is an artifact of Beta Phi Alpha. It was given to Beta Phi Alpha by Founder Elsa Ludeke. The gavel is inscribed with the names of both sororities' founders and national presidents.

== Symbols ==
Delta Zeta's history book (1983) described the insignia as follows: Its badge "was a pearled Φ with Greek letters Β and Α embossed on a field of black enamel at either side of the Φ's stem". Its colors were Kelly green and gold. Its flower was the yellow tea rose. The fraternity's open motto was Scientia, Virtus, Amicitia or "Knowledge, Virtue, Friendship". Its publication was Aldebaran.

The Creed of Beta Phi Alpha was:

We believe in service, the keynote of our daily lives, the foundation of our Fraternity, and its power to reveal the worth of woman. We believe in knowledge and its broadening influence, in understanding and unselfish love as the creators of our happiness. We pray for grace to meet success with humility, for strength and courage to rise above failure with spirit renewed, for wisdom to judge man by the spiritual values he may possess. We strive to keep faith in ourselves. We believe in the brotherhood of man and in our kinship to God, our Creator.

== Chapters ==
Following are the chapters of Beta Phi Alpha.

Name	Charter date and range	Institution	Location	Status	Notes	Ref.
Alpha	May 8, 1909 – June 22, 1941	University of California, Berkeley	Berkeley, California	Merged (ΔΖ)	(Note: This chapter was absorbed into the Mu chapter of Delta Zeta.)	
Beta	1923–1937	University of Illinois	Champaign and Urbana, Illinois	Inactive	(Note: This chapter originated as Delta Nu (local) in 1922.)	
Gamma	1923 – June 22, 1941	Colorado State Agricultural College	Fort Collins, Colorado	Merged (ΔΖ)	(Note: This chapter originated as Zeta Tau Omega (local) in 1922. At the merger, it became the Beta Sigma chapter of Delta Zeta.)	
Delta	1923–1938	University of Washington	Seattle, Washington	Inactive		
Epsilon	1923–1937	Southern Methodist University	University Park, Texas	Inactive	(Note: This chapter originated as Alpha Rho (local) in 1922.)	
Zeta	1924–1933	Lawrence University	Appleton, Wisconsin	Inactive	(Note: This chapter originated as Epsilon Alpha Phi (local) in 1919.)	
Eta	1924 – June 22, 1941	University of Pittsburgh	Pittsburgh, Pennsylvania	Merged	(Note: This chapter originated as Theta Gamma Phi (local) in 1920. At the merger, it was absorbed by the Omicron chapter of Delta Zeta, which had been installed on the campus in 1916.)	
Theta	1925 – June 22, 1941	Syracuse University	Syracuse, New York	Merged (ΔΖ)	(Note: This chapter originated as Delta Epsilon Phi (local) in 1922. At the merger, it reestablished the dormant Alpha Kappa chapter of Delta Zeta, which had been installed on the campus in 1924 but had closed by 1937.)	
Iota	1925–1933	University of Wisconsin	Madison, Wisconsin	Inactive	(Note: This chapter originated as Epsilon Alpha Phi (local) in 1924.)	
Kappa	May 7, 1926 – 1939	University of Minnesota	Minneapolis, Minnesota	Inactive	(Note: This chapter originated as Zeta Alpha (local) in 1924.)	
Lambda	May 15, 1926 – June 22, 1941	University of California, Los Angeles	Los Angeles, California	Merged (ΔΖ)	(Note: This chapter originated as Chi Zeta (local) in 1924. At the merger, it was absorbed by the Alpha Chi chapter of Delta Zeta, which had been installed on the campus in 1922.)	
Mu	May 13, 1926–1932	Ohio Wesleyan University	Delaware, Ohio	Inactive	(Note: This chapter originated as Phi Sigma Delta (local) in 1925.)	
Nu	October 24, 1926–1934	Kansas State University	Manhattan, Kansas	Inactive	(Note: This chapter originated as Gamma Phi Delta (local) in 1917.)	
Xi	1927–1932	Ohio State University	Columbus, Ohio	Inactive	(Note: This chapter originated as Lambda Pi Omega (local) in 1921.)	
Omicron	1927 – June 22, 1941	Nebraska Wesleyan University	Lincoln, Nebraska	Merged (ΔΖ)	(Note: This chapter originated as Alpha Epsilon (local) in 1907. At the merger, it became the Beta Tau chapter of Delta Zeta.)	
Pi	1927–1939	Coe College	Cedar Rapids, Iowa	Inactive	(Note: This chapter originated as Alpha Theta (local) in 1919.)	
Rho	April 7, 1928 – June 22, 1941	Oregon State University	Corvallis, Oregon	Merged (ΔΖ)	(Note: This chapter originated as Delta Omega (local) in 1920. At the merger, it was absorbed by the Chi chapter of Delta Zeta, which had been installed on the campus in 1919.)	
Sigma	1929–1937	Samford University	Homewood, Alabama	Inactive	(Note: This chapter originated as Lambda Sigma (local) in 1921. Several chapter lists note that the Sigma chapter was founded in 1929, apparently one year out of sequence.)	
Tau	June 11, 1928 – June 22, 1941	Tulane/Newcomb University	New Orleans, Louisiana	Merged (ΔΖ)	(Note: This chapter originated as Alpha Pi Epsilon (local) in 1918. At the merger, it became the Beta Upsilon chapter of Delta Zeta.)	
Upsilon	1929–1941	Miami University	Oxford, Ohio	Withdrew (ΑΧΩ)	(Note: This chapter originated as Kappa Tau Alpha (local) in 1925. Upsilon chapter was released at the time of the merger, as Miami University already was home to Delta Zeta's founding chapter. Later that same year, this chapter became the Beta Tau chapter of Alpha Chi Omega.)	
Phi	1929–1934	Purdue University	West Lafayette, Indiana	Inactive	(Note: This chapter originated as the Themis Club (local) in 1921.)	
Chi	May 17, 1930 – June 22, 1941	Oglethorpe University	Brookhaven, Georgia	Merged (ΔΖ)	(Note: This chapter originated as Phi Kappa Eta (local) in 1926. At the merger, it became the Beta Phi chapter of Delta Zeta.)	
Psi	March 6, 1931 – 1940	Florida State University	Tallahassee, Florida	Inactive	(Note: This chapter originated as Chi Gamma (local), forming in 1928.)	
Omega	1931 – June 22, 1941	Wittenberg University	Springfield, Ohio	Merged (ΔΖ)	(Note: This chapter originated as Chi Delta Omega (local) in 1923. At the merger, it became the Beta Chi chapter of Delta Zeta.)	
Alpha Alpha	1931–1939	Randolph-Macon Woman's College	Lynchburg, Virginia	Inactive	(Note: This chapter originated as Gamma Tau (local) in 1929.)	
Alpha Beta	1931 – June 22, 1941	Adelphi University	Garden City, New York	Merged (ΔΖ)	(Note: This chapter originated as Phi Gamma Sigma (local) in 1922. At the merger, it was absorbed by the Alpha Zeta chapter of Delta Zeta, which had been installed on the campus in 1922.)	
Alpha Gamma	1931–1935	University of Oregon	Eugene, Oregon	Inactive	(Note: This chapter originated as Chi Delta (local) in 1927.)	
Alpha Delta	1932–1935	Louisiana Tech University	Ruston, Louisiana	Inactive	(Note: This chapter originated as Zeta Iota (local) in 1927.)	
Alpha Epsilon	1934–1937	Westminster College	New Wilmington, Pennsylvania	Inactive	(Note: This chapter originated as Kappa Alpha Alpha (local) in 1927.)	
Alpha Zeta	1934 – June 22, 1941	College of Charleston	Charleston, South Carolina	Merged (ΔΖ)	(Note: This chapter originated as Iota Lambda Phi (local) in 1923. At the merger, it became the Beta Psi chapter of Delta Zeta.)	
Alpha Eta	1935–1938	George Washington University	Washington, D.C.	Inactive	(Note: This chapter had formerly been the Zeta chapter of the small, non-NPC national of Phi Delta, which it joined in 1927. However, its roots were as a local sorority called Alpha Sigma Theta that formed in 1927.)	
Alpha Theta	1935 – June 22, 1941	New York University	New York City, New York	Merged (ΔΖ)	(Note: This chapter had formerly been a part of the small, non-NPC national of Phi Delta. Before that, its roots were as a local sorority called Sigma Epsilon that formed in 1919, which became one of two founding chapters of Phi Delta. With the merger, the chapter became the Beta Omega chapter of ΔΖ in 1941.)	
Alpha Iota	April 25, 1937 – June 22, 1941	University of Miami	Coral Gables, Florida	Merged (ΔΖ)	(Note: This chapter originated as Alpha Kappa Alpha (local) in 1929. At the merger, it was absorbed by the Beta Nu chapter of Delta Zeta, which had been installed on the campus in 1939.)	

== Notable members ==
- Caroline Brady (philologist)
- Viola Van Katwijk (honorary)

== See also ==
- List of social sororities and women's fraternities
