= Jay F. W. Pearson =

2nd President of the University of Miami
- In office 1952–1962
- Preceded by: Bowman Foster Ashe
- Succeeded by: Henry King Stanford

Personal details
- Born: May 7, 1901
- Died: August 8, 1965 (aged 64) Miami, Florida, U.S.
- Education: University of Pittsburgh (A.B., M.A.); University of Chicago (PhD)
- Profession: Marine biologist, university administrator

Jay F. W. Pearson (May 7, 1901 – August 8, 1965) was a marine biologist and university administrator who served as the second president and chancellor of the University of Miami.

== Biography ==
Pearson served as the second president of the University of Miami from 1953 to 1962 and was a charter faculty member of the university. He was recruited from the University of Pittsburgh and succeeded Bowman Foster Ashe as University of Miami president.

Pearson ushered in a decade of growth for the University of Miami. During his presidency, the University of Miami awarded its first doctorate degrees and ended racial segregation. Enrollment increased by more than 4,000 during his tenure. He spearheaded the university's desegregation and over 70 African-American students enrolled for the first time. Pearson was named Chancellor after retiring as President.

== Works or publications ==
- Florida and Its University of Miami, New York: Newcomen Society in North America, 1958, OCLC 921957
- Record of a Tegesta Burial Mound in Palm Beach, Florida, S.l.: s.n., OCLC 6991889
- Studies on the Ecological Relations of Bees in the Chicago Area, n.p., OCLC 380511908
- Pearson, Jay Frederick Wesley (1933), "Studies on the Ecological Relations of Bees in the Chicago Region ..", Ecological Monographs, 3 (3), Durham, N.C.: 373–441, Bibcode:1933EcoM....3..373P, doi:10.2307/1943111, JSTOR 1943111, OCLC 36676521
- The Cephalopods of the "Arcturus" Expedition, 1926, OCLC 40618609
