= Christine Asdurian =

American pianist and composer

Christine Asdurian (born Armenia; February 17, 1893 – April 29, 1963) was an American pianist who composed the music to the University of Miami Alma Mater in 1926, (lyrics by William Seth Lampe). She was enrolled as a music student at the University of Miami in 1926 and 1927 as one of its 646 first enrolled students. She studied piano with Earl Chester Smith. Bertha Foster, UM’s first music dean, also mentored Christine. Bowman F. Ashe, The University of Miami’s first president, was known to recruit her to perform in civic functions and donor appreciation events.

At age 3, Asdurian traveled with her father, a clergyman, to the United States; he died soon after. She was adopted by two sisters, Sarah A. Thompson and Esther H. Thompson, of Litchfield, Connecticut, and her name was changed to Christine Oviatt Thompson.

Asdurian attended Oberlin College in Oberlin, Ohio, Converse College in Spartanburg, South Carolina, and earned an M.A. in comparative literature from Columbia University, New York in 1917. In 1924 and 1925, Asdurian was a staff pianist for Gimbels, a department store chain, performing throughout the New York tri-state area for a recurring broadcast radio show on WEAF, WGBS, and WMCA.

While a student at the University of Miami, Asdurian broadcast on WGBU and worked as a statistician with the Miami Chamber of Commerce. She also performed recitals, and composed children's music.

After attending the University of Miami, Asdurian returned to the New York area in 1928 and resumed her live radio performances until 1931. She then moved to Los Angeles and died there on April 29, 1963.
