= Atlanta Conservatory of Music =

Music school in Atlanta, Georgia, US

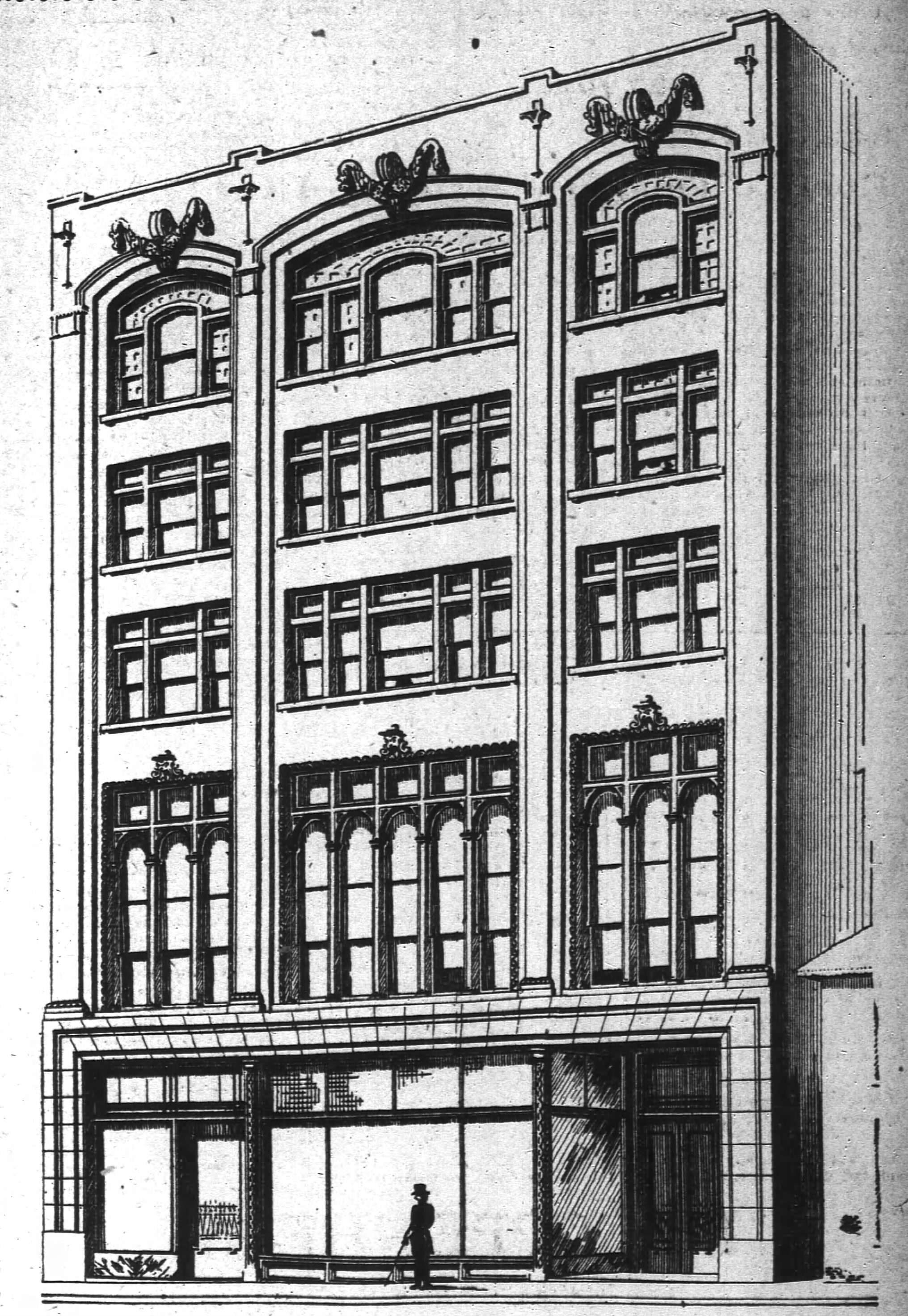
- Atlanta Conservatory of Music and Cable Piano Company building, 1907

Location
- Peachtree and Broad Streets; Atlanta, Georgia; United States

Information
- Opened: September 15, 1908
- Closed: c. 1939

Atlanta Conservatory of Music was a former private music school in Atlanta, Georgia. Although various institutions used the name Atlanta Conservatory of Music, its most successful version was incorporated in 1907 and opened on September 15, 1908, in the Cable Piano Company building. German violinist Richard Schliewen von Hofen was the school's dean and orchestra conductor. The conservatory taught vocal music and all types of musical instruments. Its purpose was to educate professional musicians and train public school teachers.

== History ==
=== Predecessors ===
The Atlanta Conservatory of Music was founded sometime around 1880 under the management of Madame and Professor Schulize. It was at the corner of Marietta and Broad Streets in Atlanta. In 1883, its director was Otto Spahr. Other faculty members included Charles Purdy, Fred Wedemeyer, and A. J. WurmIt. In June 1884, it moved to the second floor of a building at 26 North Broad Street.

In 1894, The Atlanta Journal reported that there was interest in formating a conservatory of music in Atlanta that would be associated with the Cotton States and International Exposition and would remain afterward to benefit the community. The effort was endorsed by the directors of the Atlanta Commercial Club, the women's department of the exposition, and the executive committee of the exposition.

In 1899, the Atlanta Conservatory of Music was at 216 Peachtree Street. In May 1901, newspapers reported that Nellie Hook, the conservatory's professor of fiddling, made $500 a month ($19,350 in today's money). The conservatory introduced a method of teaching through correspondence in 1906, using a device called the Revealer.

=== Atlanta Conservatory ===
In 1907, a new Atlanta Conservatory of Music was formed to teach instrumental music, dramatics arts, literature, and vocal music. Fulton County issued a charter for the conservatory on November 26, 1907. Its incorporators were W. S. Cox of College Park, Dr. J. W. Gaines of College Park, E. P. McPherson of Chicago, and George W. Wilkins of Atlanta. Cox was the conservatory's president and Wilkins was its secretary.

The new conservatory opened on September 15, 1908. According to The Atlanta Constitution, the conservatory was viewed as a way to elevate Atlanta as an artistic and educational center for music. This time, the conservatory had "unlimited resources" and directors who had business, executive, and teaching experience. It had 900 students in 1922. In 1927, tuition was $100 to $500 and the conservatory offered two $300 scholarships.

The conservatory's building was destroyed in a fire on November 18, 1936. Three students were killed in the fire and nineteen students and teachers were injured escaping the building. Music teacher Hazel Wood and five students escaped the fire by jumping from a fifth window to the roof of an adjourning three-story building. Atlanta's fire chief described the building as "one of three worst firetraps in Atlanta" because of its workshop and cash of inflammable materials on the lower floor and students on the upper floors.

== Campus ==
In October 1907, construction began on a five-story building, designed by architect Harry Leslie Walker, to house the conservatory and The Cable Piano Company. The conservatory was on the building's fourth and fifth floors which included classrooms, studios, offices, and an auditorium that seated 600 people for lectures and recitals. The auditorium had a large stage for chorals and orchestras and was equipped with a Mason & Hamlin concert pipe organ and grand piano. There was also a concert hall on the building's second floor. The Cable Building was located at the junction of Peachtree and Broad Streets on land previously owned by Dr. A. W. Calhoun. It was constructed with new technologies, including an elevator and fireproofing.

In 1908, the conservatory purchased and remodeled the nearby A. W. Calhoun home on the corner of Mitchell and Washington Streets for use as a student dormitory. The dormitory had streetcar service and was located within walking distance of the conservatory, shopping, and the railroad.

In 1936, the Cable Building was destroyed in a fire.

== Academics ==
=== Curriculum ===
The Atlanta Conservatory of Music awarded certificates and a Bachelor of Music degree. The conservatory taught vocal music and orchestral musical instruments. It taught ear training, ensemble playing, hand culture, harmony counterpoint, music theory, musical history, sight reading, and singing, along with piano, pipe organ, violin, and other string instruments. Its instructors provided both theoretical and practical instruction in music. The conservatory also taught dramatic arts, modern languages, oratory, and training for public school teachers. It also had a preparatory department in 1923.

=== Faculty ===
In 1908, German violinist Richard Schliewen von Hofen became the dean of the conservatory and the conductor of an orchestra. At the same time, he was a professor of violin at Cox College. Other faculty came from Europe and New York City, including Eta Bartholomew, organ and piano; Margarete Bartholomew, piano; Kate Blatterman, piano; Mrs. J. Lewis Brown, piano; Ethel Dupree, piano; Sara Elizabeth Eastlack, oratory and physical culture; Anna E. Hunt, violin; Anna Schwarz-Wagner, piano; Paul Schwarz Wagner, director of voice; Sara McDonald Sheridan, voice; Henry Hunter Walsh, director of piano; Fred Wedemeyer, clarinet; and Charles Wurm, cornet. Some, such as Shliewen and Walsh, were touring musicians of notability.

Later, Georg Linder was the conservatory's director for 27 years. In 1928, the school had a faculty of 21.

== Student life ==
The Atlanta chapter of the American Guild of Organists held its organizational meeting at the Atlanta Conservatory of Music on October 6, 1914. The conservatory had a chapter of the women's music fraternity, Mu Phi Epsilon, established on November 13, 1926.

== Notable people ==
=== Alumni ===
- Lee Roy Abernathy, gospel musician
- Oliver Hardy, actor and comedian

=== Faculty ===
- Mortimer Wilson, composition instructor
- Earle Chester Smith, director of piano in 1914

== See also ==
- List of colleges and universities in Georgia (U.S. state)
- List of pre-college music schools
- List of university and college schools of music
