= Music Conservatory (Chicago College of Performing Arts) =

Coordinates: 41°52′35.1″N 87°37′29.5″W

The Music Conservatory is a musical arts conservatory at the Chicago College of Performing Arts at Roosevelt University in Chicago, Illinois, United States.

It was founded in 1867 as the Chicago Musical College, a conservatory. In 1954, the Chicago Musical College became part of Roosevelt University. In 1997, the Chicago Musical College joined with the university's theater program to become the College of the Performing Arts; and in 2000, it was renamed the Music Conservatory of the Chicago College of Performing Arts.

The Music Conservatory is organized into departments coordinated by the director. Curricula with a major in piano, string (including guitar), wind, or percussion instruments, voice, orchestral studies, composition, music education, and jazz studies lead to the degree of Bachelor of Music. An individualized program of studies in music combined with course work in a second discipline leads to the Bachelor of Musical Arts degree.
