= Bowman Foster Ashe =

1st President of the University of Miami
- In office 1926 – November 1952
- Succeeded by: Jay F. W. Pearson

Personal details
- Born: April 3, 1885 Scottdale, Pennsylvania, U.S.
- Died: December 16, 1952 (aged 67) Coral Gables, Florida, U.S.
- Education: University of Pittsburgh (B.S.)
- Profession: University administrator

Bowman Foster Ashe (April 3, 1885 – December 16, 1952) was a U.S. educator who served as the first president of the University of Miami.

== Early life and education ==
Bowman Foster Ashe was born in Scottdale, Pennsylvania, a suburb of Pittsburgh, on April 3, 1885, one of six sons of a Methodist minister.

He attended the University of Mount Union in Alliance, Ohio, and then transferred to the University of Pittsburgh, where he earned a Bachelor of Science degree in 1910.

== Career ==
After graduation, Ashe took a job teaching public school English and history. He also worked as the educational and social director for Langeloth, Pennsylvania, a coal mining company town near Pittsburgh. Ashe's work eventually led him back to the University of Pittsburgh, where he became a faculty member and supervised the admission, transfer, and academic progress of freshmen and sophomores.

=== University of Miami ===
The founders of the University of Miami's hired Ashe from the University of Pittsburgh to oversee the institution during its challenged infancy. During Ashe's presidency, the university added the School of Law (1928), the School of Business Administration (1929), the School of Education (1929), the Graduate School (1941), the School of Marine and Atmospheric Science (1943), the College of Engineering (1947), and the School of Medicine (1952).

In 1926, Ashe partnered with Seminole Tribe in building the Iron Arrow Honor Society, which now is the highest honor the University of Miami can bestow on a student, administrator, or faculty member. At its 1926 founding, Iron Arrow was founded to recognize male high achievers. Fifty years later, in 1976, the federal government notified the University of Miami that it was providing significant assistance to Iron Arrow in violation of Title IX of the Education Amendments of 1972. In 1985, breaking with over fifty years of tradition, the society's all-male membership voted to admit women and Iron Arrow was allowed back on campus.

In 1929, with the collapse of the economy, the University of Miami's financial plight was severe, and Ashe took over as chairman of its board of trustees. He later gave up that role but continued as president. He recruited Jay F. W. Pearson from the University of Pittsburgh to join him as a part of the charter faculty and as an administrator. Pearson took over as president in November 1952 upon the first of two debilitating strokes, which led to Ashe's death the following month.

== Honors and legacy ==
The University of Miami's administration building, the Bowman Foster Ashe Administration Building, and Bowman Foster Ashe Elementary School in West Kendall, Florida are both named in his honor. Ashe was also inducted into the Iron Arrow Honor Society, the University of Miami's highest honor, which he helped create in 1926.

== Personal life ==
Ashe's grandson, Gary Dunn, played collegiate football at the University of Miami, In 1976, Dunn was drafted by the Pittsburgh Steelers, where he played for 12 seasons.

== Death ==
Ashe died December 16, 1952 of cerebral hemorrhage, at Doctors Hospital in Coral Gables, Florida, at age 67.
