= Defunct North American collegiate sororities =

This article describes smaller collegiate sororities created in the nineteenth century and early to middle twentieth century on campuses in the United States and Canada. These sororities are defunct. Individual chapters may be affiliated with National Panhellenic Conference (NPC) sororities.

== Aloquin ==
Aloquin was founded as a co-educational organization in 1905 at Ohio University called The Union. As a co-ed organization, its purpose was "to raise social and moral standards of college life." Splitting along gender lines in 1910, the men became affiliated with Phrenocon, a national association that would go on to rename itself Phi Kappa Tau in 1916, while on September 12, 1912, the 65 women of the Ohio University Union became Aloquin. The name was created from the combination of the Latin words for "why not?" This was quickly extended to "Why not strengthen? Why not encourage?" It aimed to "promote a spirit of democracy and equality." They hoped to establish high ideals of college work. They wanted to "foster principles which will develop integrity, morality, and strength of character...the best type of womanhood... the bond of union between students and alma mater."

Aloquin's colors were blue and gold. The pin was a black enamel "A" set with sixteen pearls.

The sorority held a convention in Athens, Ohio, on December 12, 1913. A national president and a general secretary were elected. Ohio University's chapter affiliated with Zeta Tau Alpha in 1922. OSU's went with Chi Omega in 1919. Wittenburg's reorganized as Theta Gamma Rho in 1918, and later, became a chapter of Kappa Delta in 1927.

Of the OSU chapter, Chi Omega's history recalled that the Aloquins "decided that there would be many more advantages derived from membership in a national fraternity than from a local state organization."

=== Chapters ===
The following are the known chapters of the Aloquin sorority.

Chapter	Charter date and range	Institution	Location	Status	Ref.
Alpha	1905–1922	Ohio University	Athens, Ohio	Withdrew (ΖΤΑ)	(Note: The last remaining chapter, this affiliation marked the final dispersal of Aloquin, whose three chapters joined other sororities via independent withdrawals.)
Beta	1914–1919	Ohio State University	Columbus, Ohio	Withdrew (ΧΩ)	
Gamma	1915–1918	Wittenberg College	Springfield, Ohio	Withdrew (ΘΓΡ (local); see ΚΔ)	

== Beta Delta Pi ==
The Alpha chapter began as D.D.D. in January 1887 at Bucknell Female Institute. On September 15, 1887, the sorority changed its name to Beta Delta Pi (ΒΔΠ) with charter members Mame Custer, Clara Fairchilds, Jessie Jones, Sue Loudon, Carrie Lovell, and Luella Peck. The sorority's colors were Nile green (light green) and pink.

Beta chapter was chartered at Miss Gordon's School in Philadelphia, Pennsylvania. The Lambda chapter was colonized at the University of Toronto in 1914. Lambda chapter decided "something must be done to strengthen our position nationally." The sorority was renewed in 1916 at Philadelphia. The Lambda chapter of Beta Delta Pi affiliated with Alpha Gamma Delta in early 1919.

=== Chapters ===
The 1916 edition of Toronto's yearbook listed the following chapters, without institutions. Inactive chapters and institutions are in italics.

Chapter	Charter date and range	Institution	Location	Status	Ref.
Alpha	September 15, 1887	Bucknell Female Institute	Lewisburg, Pennsylvania	Inactive	(Note: Chapter formed from D.D.D., established in January 1887.)
Beta		Miss Gordon's School for Girls	Philadelphia, Pennsylvania	Inactive	
Gamma	April 1901	Mlle. Bouligne's Select School	Chevy Chase, Maryland	Inactive	
Gamma			New York City, New York	Inactive	
Delta			Stamford, Connecticut	Inactive	
Epsilon			Chevy Chase, Maryland	Inactive	
Eta			Peekskill-on-the-Hudson, New York	Inactive	
Theta			Hollidaysburg, Pennsylvania	Inactive	
Iota			Atlantic City, New Jersey	Inactive	
Lambda	1914–1919	University of Toronto	Toronto, Ontario, Canada	Merged (ΑΓΔ)	(Note: Chapter merged with Alpha Gamma Delta.)

== Delta Chi Alpha ==
Delta Chi Alpha (ΔΧΑ) was one of the first Greek-lettered organizations for collegiate women. It was founded in May 1878 at Ohio Wesleyan University. The badge was silver with a monogram of the letters "encircled by a frosted wreath". The colors were cardinal and ecru.

In 1879, the membership was 25. In 1882, the fraternity established a Beta chapter at Beaver College. Alpha chapter at Ohio Wesleyan affiliated with Kappa Alpha Theta. It is not known what happened to the Beta chapter.

=== Chapters ===
Chapter	Charter date and range	Institution	Location	Status	Ref.
Alpha	1878	Ohio Wesleyan University	Delaware, Ohio	Merged (ΚΑΘ)	
Beta	1882	Beaver College	Cheltenham Township, Pennsylvania	Inactive	

== Epsilon Tau ==
Epsilon Tau (ΕΤ) was a professional sorority for homeopathy. It was established on November 4, 1898 at Boston University School of Medicine. It also had chapters at Hahnemann Medical College and the New York Medical College and Hospital for Women. After those chapters went inactive, the Alpha chapter continued to operate as a local sorority until 1908.

Epsilon Tau's badge was a green enamel diamond, bearing the Greek letters "ΕΤ" in gold. Its colors were fern green and white. Its flower was the white carnation.

=== Chapters ===
Chapter	Charter date and range	Institution	Location	Status	Ref.
Alpha	November 4, 1898 – 1908	Boston University School of Medicine	Boston, Massachusetts	Inactive	
Beta		Hahnemann Medical College	Chicago, Illinois	Inactive	(Note: The college closed in 1921.)
Gamma		New York Medical College and Hospital for Women	Manhattan, New York	Inactive	(Note: The college closed in 1917.)

== Gamma Beta Sigma ==
Gamma Beta Sigma (ΓΒΣ) was a junior college social sorority. It was established in November 3, 1900 at the Columbia Institute in Columbia, Tennessee. A second chapter was established in Edgewood School, followed by a third chapter at Saint Mary's School in 1901. On February 16, 1904, Gamma Beta Sigma, Inc. was incorporated as a social sorority in the State of North Carolina. Its purpose was "to make firmer the bonds of friendship already uniting us as members of this society".

It had three active chapters in 1909. Its last active chapter at Saint Mary's School became a chapter of Alpha Sigma Alpha in. 1909.

Gamma Beta Sigma's insignia included a skull and crossed bones, a skeleton, a seven-pointed star, and a black cat. The sorority's badge was a seven-pointed star on a hexagon. It did not have a pledge pin. Its colors were purple and gold. The sorority's flag was purple and gold, with a facsimile of its badge. Its flower was the violet.

=== Chapters ===
Chapter	Charter date and range	Institution	Location	Status	Ref.
Alpha	November 3, 1900 – 190x ?	Columbia Institute	Columbia, Tennessee	Inactive	
Beta	190x ? – 190x ?	Edgewood School	Baltimore, Maryland	Inactive	
Gamma	1901 – May 27, 1909	Saint Mary's School	Raleigh, North Carolina	Merged (ΑΣΑ)	(Note: Became the Gamma Beta Sigma chapter of Alpha Sigma Alpha.)

== Phi Mu Epsilon ==
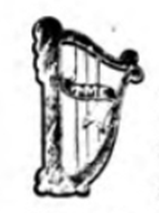
Badge of Phi Mu Epsilon

Phi Mu Epsilon (ΦΜΕ) music sorority was established on October 1, 1892 at DePauw University in Greencastle, Indiana. Its founder was James L. Howe, dean of the College of Music, who wanted to promote friendships between music students. It remained a local sorority for ten years before forming a second chapter at Syracuse University in 1902. Both chapters rented houses.

There was a music sorority by the same name at Northwestern University and the University of Michigan; however, Baird's Manual of American College Fraternities was not able to confirm their connection to this sorority. In 1905, Phi Mu Epsilon had initiated 225 members. In 1906, Phi Mu Epsilon merged into Mu Phi Epsilon.

Phi Mu Epsilon's badge was an Italian harp with three strings; lying across the strings was a black enamel ribbon with the Greek letters "ΦΜΕ" in gold. The sorority's colors were lavender and white. Its flower was the white rose.

=== Chapters ===
Chapter	Charter date and range	Institution	Location	Status	Ref.
Alpha	October 1, 1892 – December 9, 1906	DePauw University	Greencastle, Indiana	Merged (ΜΦΕ)	
Beta	1902 – December 8, 1906	Syracuse University	Syracuse, New York	Merged (ΜΦΕ)	

== Sigma Sigma Delta ==
On November 11, 1924, the society Lanterna Laetitiae was organized at Bucknell University. Four years later, their decision to become a national organization prompted the name change to Sigma Sigma Delta (ΣΣΔ). The sorority had "open membership as a fundamental principle". In Ohio Marietta's catalogue (1933), the sorority is listed as "Sigma Sigma Delta National Open Sorority".

The sorority's official colors were green and white. Its flower was a white carnation. Its publication was The Evergreen.

By 1938, all chapters had dissolved or disaffiliated. Northwestern's went to Phi Omega Pi. Baldwin-Wallace's reorganized as the local, Theta Tau Delta, then affiliated with Phi Mu.

=== Chapters ===
The following are its known chapters of Sigma Sigma Delta.

Chapter	Charter date and range	Institution	Location	Status	Ref.
Alpha	November 11, 1924 – 1936	Bucknell University	Lewisburg, Pennsylvania	Inactive	
Beta	1928–1935	Susquehanna University	Selinsgrove, Pennsylvania	Inactive	(Note: Chapter formed from Theta Chi Lambda, established in 1927.)
Gamma	1928–1934	Northwestern University	Evanston, Illinois	Merged (ΦΩΠ)	(Note: Chapter formed from Aeukiga, established in 1922. The chapter merged with an existing Phi Omega Pi chapter)
Delta	1928–1932	Wittenburg University	Springfield, Ohio	Inactive	(Note: Chapter formed from the Ferncliffe League, established in 1923.)
Epsilon	1928–1934	Marietta College	Marietta, Ohio	Inactive	(Note: Chapter formed from Coletna, established in 1923.)
Zeta	1928–1934	Knox College	Galesburg, Illinois	Inactive	
Eta	1932–1938	Baldwin Wallace College	Berea, Ohio	Withdrew (local, then ΦΜ)	(Note: Chapter formed from the Calumet Club, established in 1931. The chapter became Theta Tau Delta (local), then a Phi Mu chapter.)

== See also ==
- List of social sororities and women's fraternities
