= John Hussman =

American hedge fund manager (born 1962)

- Born: John Peter Hussman; October 15, 1962 (age 63)
- Education: Northwestern University (BSc, MS); Stanford University (PhD)
- Occupations: Prof. International Finance University of Michigan (1992–98): Hedge fund manager Hussman Strategic Advisors (1998–); Philanthropist Hussman Foundation (2004–)
- Known for: Founder, Hussman Strategic Advisors
- Spouse: Theresa "Terri" Hussman
- Children: 4
- Website: https://www.hussman.com

John Peter Hussman (born 15 October 1962), is an American philanthropist, economist, and hedge fund manager.

== Early life ==
Hussman holds a PhD in economics from Stanford University, as well as a master's degree in education and social policy and a bachelor's degree in economics from Northwestern University.

== Career ==
=== Academic ===
From 1992 to 1998, he was Professor of Economics and International Finance at the University of Michigan.

=== Investing ===
In the mid-1980s, Hussman worked as an options mathematician for Peters & Company at the Chicago Board of Trade, and in 1988 founded his investment company, now known as Hussman Strategic Advisors. After spending much of the early-1990s as a "lonely raging bull", he became increasingly bearish in the late-1990's. He successfully anticipated the collapse of dot-com bubble, as well as the 2008 financial crisis, then reversed his view about valuations after the market collapse in late-2008, declaring “U.S. stocks are now undervalued”.

By September 2010, Hussman managed US$6.7 billion. However, between 2013 and 2017, he became increasingly bearish, asserting that the "quantitative easing" ("QE") and zero interest rate policies of the Federal Reserve had contributed to a “hypervalued market”, Hussman's investment performance suffered as a result, and he was labeled a “permabear”. His performance during this period sharply lagged the S&P 500, in contrast to the years prior to 2013. By late-2017, assets under management had declined to US$1 billion. Hussman has regularly commented on his error during that period, tracing it to his insistence on stress-testing his methods against Depression-era data following the 2008 financial crisis, which led him to emphasize the importance of “overvalued, overbought, overbullish” conditions that had historically been reliable indications of market tops. In late-2017, he gave up, saying "Evidently, once interest rates hit zero, so did the collective IQ of Wall Street".

Hussman is known for a strongly quantitative approach to macro-investing and publishes a regular market comment freely available on his website, that updates his projections of 10-12 year returns for the S&P 500, which remained below 0% from 2015 until early-2020, when the market plunged in response to the COVID-19 pandemic. In July 2017, Hussman said that markets were "at the most offensive level of overvaluation in history" — beyond even 1929 and 2000". In June 2018, he projected a market decline in excess of 64% (two-thirds) by the trough of the market cycle. He reiterated that projection of a two-thirds market loss in November 2020, after a rebound in the S&P 500 back to its pre-pandemic highs.

As he did in 2000, at the peak of the technology bubble [ Hussman Investment Research & Insight, October 3, 2000 ] and in 2007, before the 2008 financial crisis [ Market Internals Go Negative, July 30, 2007 ], Hussman regularly emphasizes that his statements about valuations are not near-term forecasts, and that bubbles can only occur when investors ignore overvaluation for years. In practice, he says, “In addition to valuations, which inform us about long-term returns and full-cycle risks, we consider the uniformity or divergence of market internals, to infer whether investors are inclined toward speculation or toward risk-aversion.” Hussman argues that the worst market losses occur when both are unfavorable, opening a “trap door.”.

=== Philanthropic ===
In 1998, Hussman left academic economics to increase his focus on philanthropic efforts, using his ongoing investing work to fund charitable projects in autism, global health, education, displaced populations, homelessness, and research focused on the genetics and biology of complex conditions such as autism and multiple sclerosis. He has authored and co-authored numerous research papers in peer-reviewed scientific journals, including Molecular Autism, Genes and Immunity, and Frontiers in Pharmacology.

In 2001, Hussman proposed what is now known as the “excitatory/inhibitory” theory of autism in the Journal of Autism and Developmental Disorders. Drawing on evidence from genetic, neuroanatomical, and neurobiological research, he proposed: "Although it is possible that the breadth of impairments in autism are caused by multiple defects in relatively independent systems, autism may instead reflect dysfunction in a single factor shared in common by many systems. Specifically, the severe disruptions observed in autism may be linked to suppression of GABAergic inhibition, resulting in excessive stimulation of glutamate-specialized neurons and loss of sensory gating. This view recognizes the possibility of multiple etiologies in autism. That is, there may exist a spectrum of genetic and environmental factors which impair inhibitory tone. Loss of inhibitory control from GABAergic neurons may result in hyperexcitation of vulnerable target neurons. Such a model may provide a reasonable characterization of autism." Rubenstein and Merzenich later cited Hussman's work in 2003, increasing attention to the hypothesis, and stating it in terms of an increased ratio of excitation to inhibition (E/I).

In 2012, Hussman founded the Hussman Institute for Autism. The Institute's programs focus on advancing translational research on the genetics and neurobiology of autism, and on developing a continuum of resources to provide positive support to individuals with autism, including training materials, model programs, and research-based practices. The Institute shut down in 2020.

Hussman has served on non-profit boards of institutions including the University of Miami, the Baudhuin School for Autism at Nova Southeastern University, and the Autism Society of America. Hussman and his wife Terri also serve on the boards of Maryland charities including the Light House Homelessness Prevention Center, and Hospice of the Chesapeake. Hussman was chosen as the 2013 Philanthropist of the Year by the AFP.

== See also ==
- John P. Hussman Institute for Human Genomics
