= Lake Osceola (Coral Gables) =

Lake in the state of Florida, United States

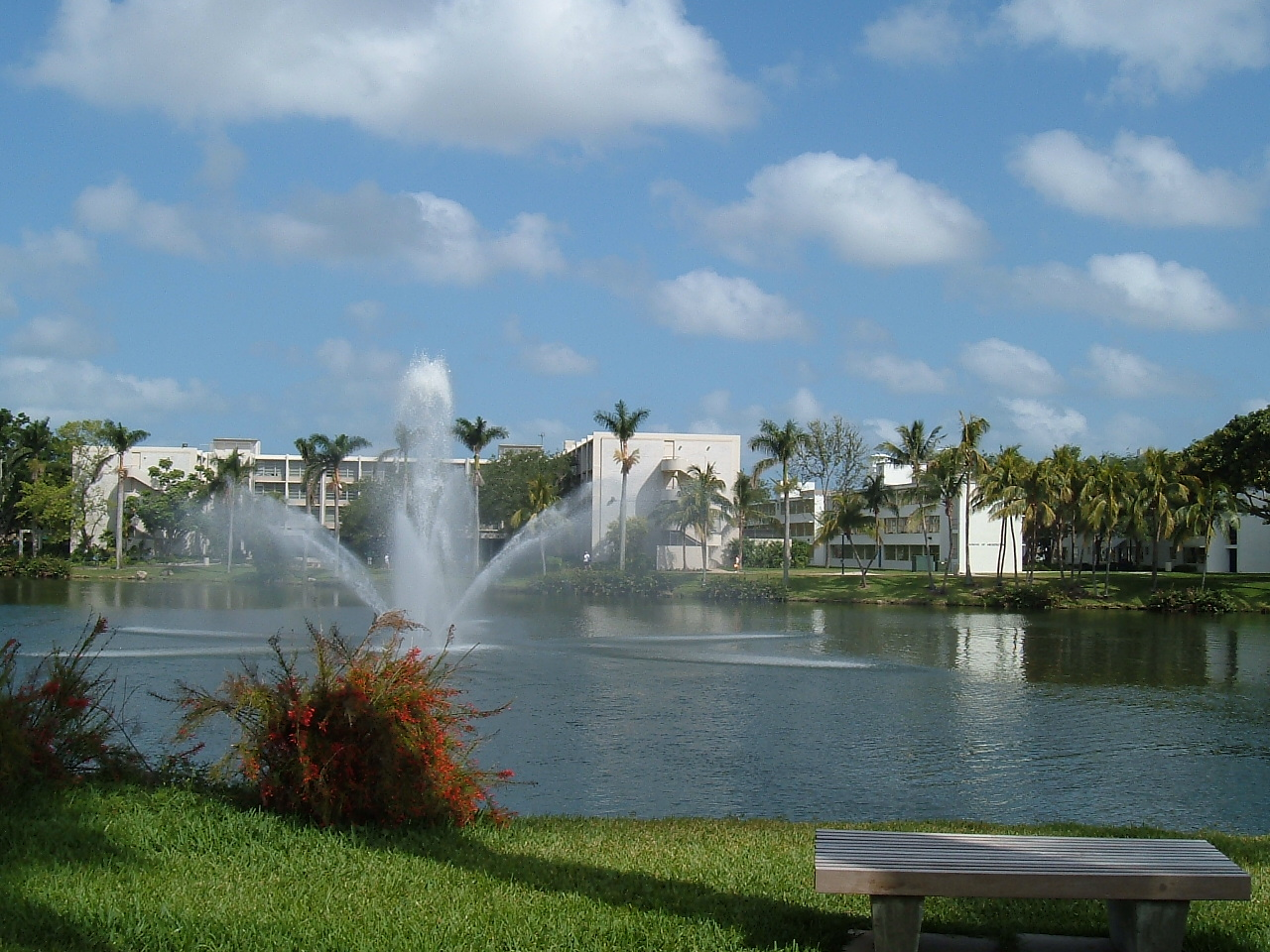
- Lake Osceola on the University of Miami campus in Coral Gables, Florida in May 2006

- Location within Florida
- Location: University of Miami, Coral Gables, Florida, U.S.
- Coordinates: 25°43′06″N 80°16′45″W
- Type: Man-made lake

Lake Osceola is a man-made freshwater lake located at the center of the University of Miami campus in Coral Gables, Florida.

== History ==
Construction of Lake Osceola began in the late 1940s. It was initially designed and envisioned to connect Biscayne Bay and surrounding bodies of water. But with the University of Miami's expansion by the 1940s, a decision was made to instead developed it as a man-made lake for the University of Miami campus. Due to the lake's connection with Biscayne Bay and other natural bodies of water, wildlife began to inhabit the lake following initial migration of various species of fish and waterfowl.

In 1926, Lake Osceola was given its name by Iron Arrow Honor Society, a University of Miami honor society that is the highest honor bestowed by the University, in recognition of Osceola, a Seminole tribe leader and historical figure in Florida.

=== Death of Chad Meredith ===
In the early hours of November 5, 2001, 18-year-old University of Miami student Chad Meredith, who had earlier that evening attended a Ludacris concert, drowned in Lake Osceola while attempting to swim across the lake while intoxicated with two brothers from the Kappa Sigma fraternity, where he was then a pledge. Swimming in Lake Osceola was prohibited by the University of Miami. But following Meredith's death, the university made swimming in the lake punishable by expulsion.

Police reports later cited Meredith's dangerously high blood alcohol content in conjunction with dropping water temperatures and exhaustion as primary factors in his death, and two fraternity members who accompanied him were criminally charged with "negligence, breach of fiduciary duty, and breach of duty to aid and/or rescue." The final civil settlement of $12.6 million over the incident was considered one of the largest in the nation related to fraternity hazing fatalities. In 2005, the Florida legislature passed the Chad Meredith Act that criminalized hazing incidents at Florida high schools and universities. The state statute was signed into law by then Florida governor Jeb Bush on June 7, 2005.

== Ecosystem ==
Due to the lake's connection with Biscayne Bay, wildlife from the bay have continued to thrive in Lake Osceola's freshwater environment, including a number of fish, bird, and reptile species. Animals such as manatees, turtles, ducks, ibis, and snakes such as cottonmouths populate the lake.

Due to a number of contributing factors, including fertilizer runoff, Lake Osceola began experiencing stratification from algae infestations in the lake's lower strata, resulting in decreased oxygen levels and the death of numerous species of fish that had inhabited the lake since its creation in the late 1940s. To combat decreasing oxygen levels and halt greater damage to the ecosystem, the university installed a fountain at the center of Lake Osceola to improve aeration and increase species diversification.
