= John P. Hussman Institute for Human Genomics =

US research center

Coordinates: 25.789696°N 80.210726°W

The John P. Hussman Institute for Human Genomics (HIHG) is a genome center at the University of Miami's Miller School of Medicine in Miami, Florida.

The institute was established in January 2007 with the goal of discovering genetic influences on human health and applying this knowledge to medical practice. It is listed as one of the top 20 genome centers in the world by DNA sequencing capacity. It is named after John Hussman, a hedge fund manager.
