= University of Miami =

Private university in Coral Gables, Florida, US

- Motto: Magna est veritas (Latin); Investigatio conservatid disseminatio et scientiae (Latin)
- Motto in English: "Great is the truth" "Research, conservation, and dissemination of knowledge"
- Type: Private research university
- Established: April 8, 1925; 101 years ago
- Accreditation: SACS
- Academic affiliations: AAU; ICUF; NAICU; ORAU; sea-grant; space-grant
- Endowment: $1.71 billion (2025)
- Budget: $6.6 billion (2026)
- President: Joe Echevarria
- Provost: Joel Samuels
- Faculty: 3,695 (fall 2025)
- Administrative staff: 18,003 (fall 2025)
- Students: 20,104 (fall 2025)
- Undergraduates: 13,241 (fall 2025)
- Postgraduates: 6,863 (fall 2025)
- Location: Coral Gables-Miami, Florida, United States; 25.7216°N 80.2793°W
- Campus: 453 acres (1.83 km^{2}) (total); Small city
- Newspaper: The Miami Hurricane
- Colors: Orange, white and green
- Nickname: Hurricanes
- Sporting affiliations: NCAA Division I FBS – ACC
- Mascot: Sebastian the Ibis
- Website: miami.edu

The University of Miami (UM, UMiami, Miami, U of M, and The U) is a private research university in Coral Gables, Florida, United States. As of 2025, the university enrolled 20,104 students in two colleges and eight schools across over 350 academic majors and programs, including the Miller School of Medicine in Miami's Health District, the law school on the main campus, the Rosenstiel School of Marine, Atmospheric, and Earth Science on Virginia Key, and additional research facilities in southern Miami-Dade County.

The University of Miami offers 154 undergraduate, 150 master's, and 70 doctoral degree programs. With over 21,000 faculty and staff as of 2025, the University of Miami is the second-largest employer in Miami-Dade County. The university's main campus in Coral Gables spans 240 acres (0.97 km^{2}), has over 5,700,000 square feet (530,000 m^{2}) of buildings, and is located 7 miles (11 km) southwest of downtown Miami, the heart of the nation's eighth-largest and world's 70th-largest metropolitan area. As of 2024, the university had annual research expenditures of $520 million, making it the 61st-largest university for research in the nation.

As of 2025, the University of Miami has 240,769 alumni from all 50 states and 174 foreign nations. University of Miami faculty include a number of notable academics across nearly all disciplines, including four Nobel Prize recipients. The university is classified among "R1: Doctoral Universities – Very high research activity" and is a member of the Association of American Universities (AAU).

The University of Miami's intercollegiate athletic teams are collectively known as the Miami Hurricanes and compete in Division I of the National Collegiate Athletic Association. Its football team has won five national championships since 1983, and its baseball team has won four national championships since 1982.

== History ==
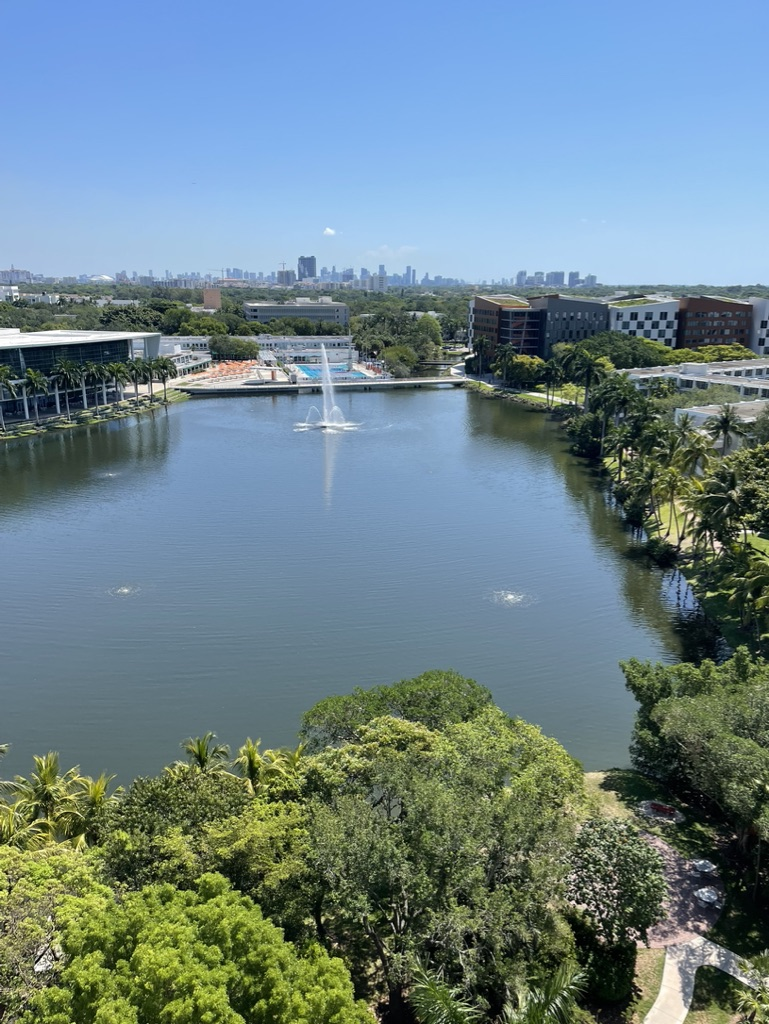
Lake Osceola on the University of Miami campus with the Downtown Miami skyline in the background in May 2022

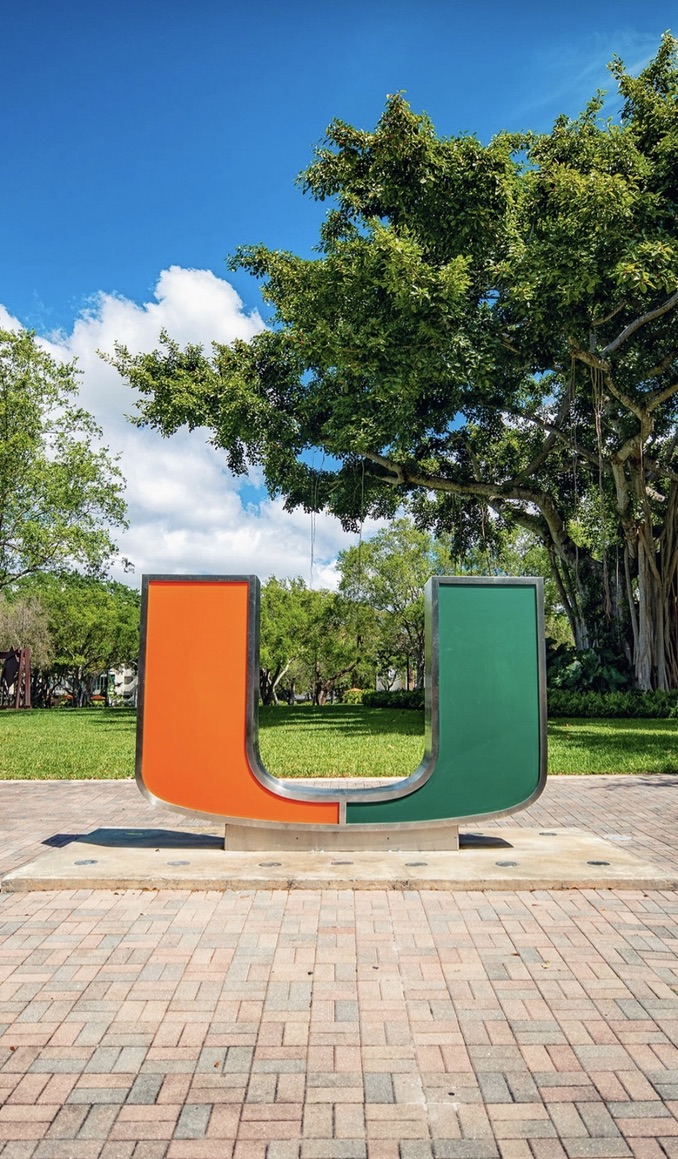
The iconic U statue, which stands nearly seven feet high and weighs nearly 1,000 pounds, on the University of Miami campus in March 2020

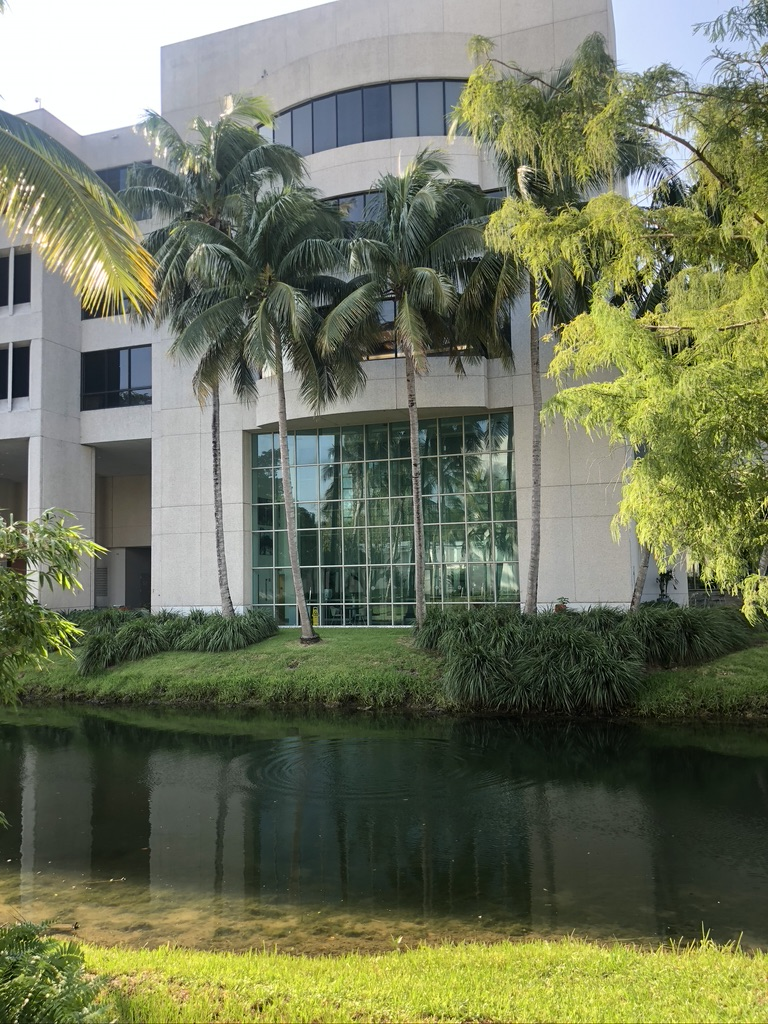
Miami Herbert Business School, one of the world's top-ranked business schools, on the University of Miami campus in September 2020

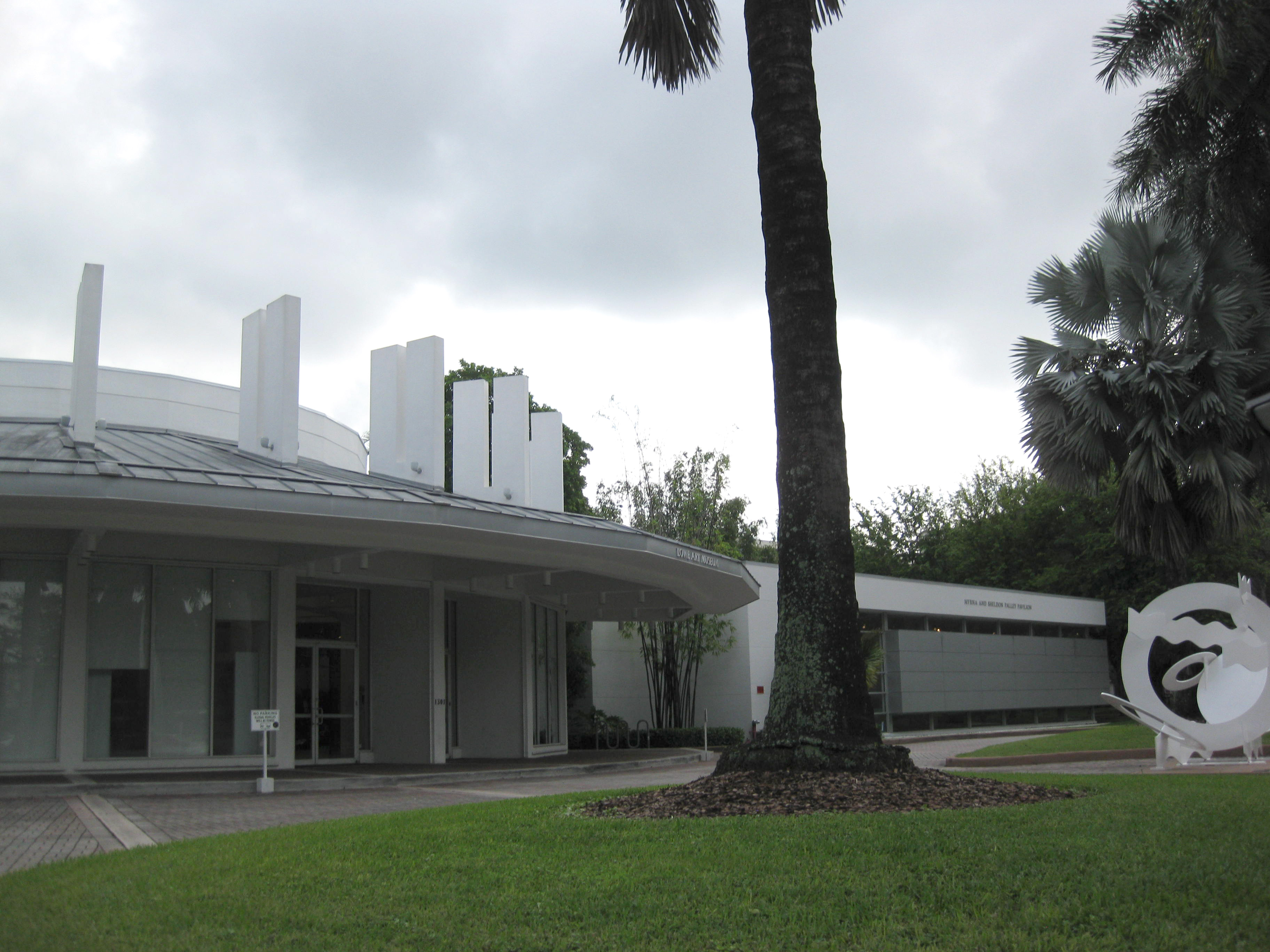
Lowe Art Museum, the University of Miami's art museum founded in 1950, houses over 19,000 art objects spanning over 5,000 years.

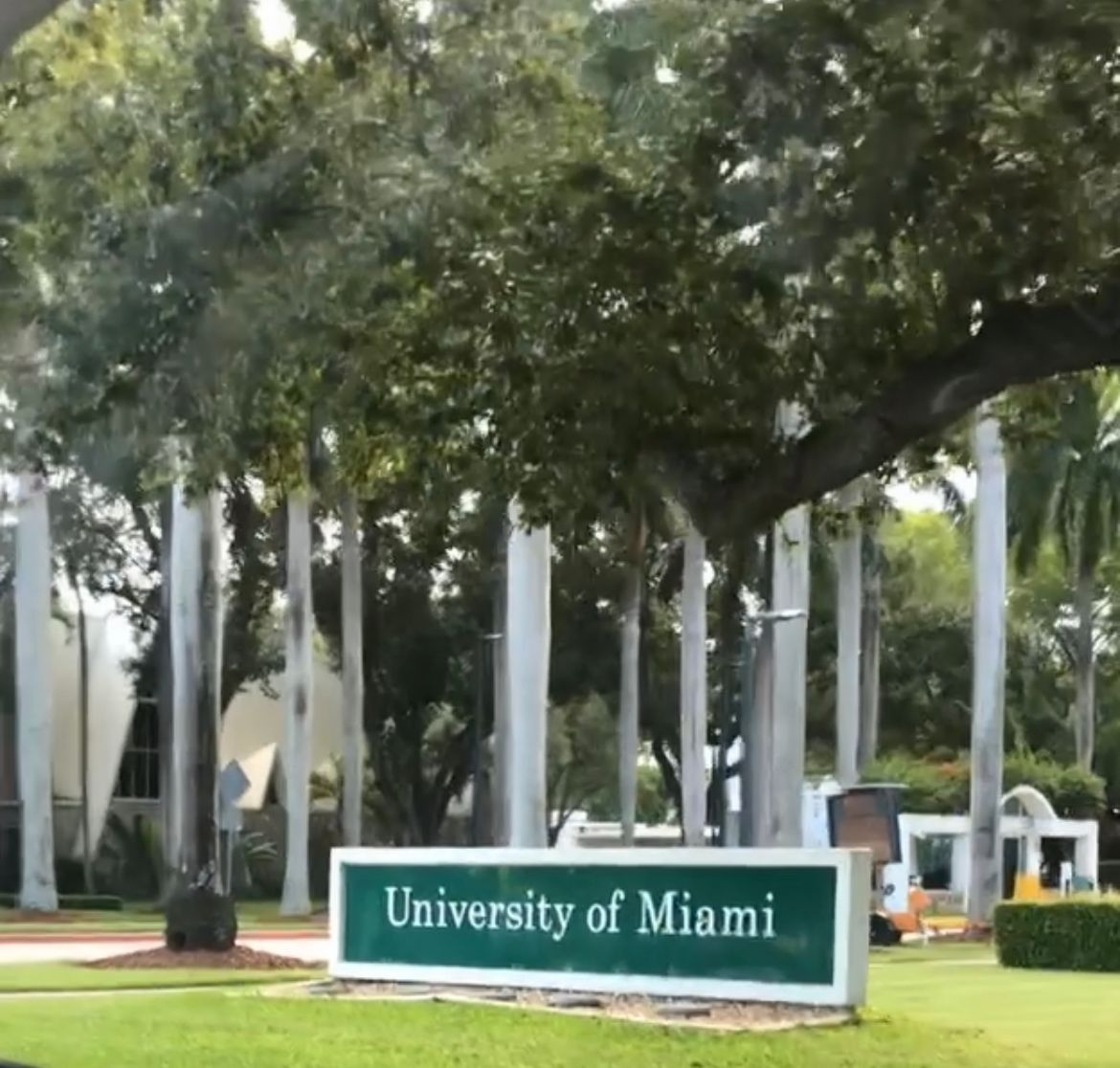
The main gate entrance to the University of Miami campus in May 2022

=== Leadership ===
==== Bowman Foster Ashe (1926 to 1952) ====
In 1925, the University of Miami was founded by a group of citizens who sought to offer "unique opportunities to develop inter-American studies, further creative work in the arts and letters, and conduct teaching and research programs in tropical studies", according to the university's founding charter. They believed that a local university would benefit the Miami metropolitan area and were optimistic that the university would be a beneficiary of future financial support, especially since South Florida was benefiting from the historic 1920s land boom. During this era of Jim Crow laws, there were three large state-funded universities in Florida for white male students, white female students, and black students: the University of Florida in Gainesville and Florida State University and Florida A&M University, both in Tallahassee. Like most private universities of the time, the University of Miami was founded as a coeducational institution but not yet open to Black students.

In 1925, George E. Merrick, founder of Coral Gables, granted 160 acres (0.6 km^{2}) and nearly $5,000,000 ($91.8 million, adjusted for current inflation) for the university's founding. The contributions included land contracts and mortgages on real estate that had been sold in the city. The university was formally chartered April 8, 1925 by the Circuit Court for Dade County. But by 1926, as the first class of 372 students enrolled at the new university, the land boom had collapsed and hopes for a speedy recovery were dashed by the Great Miami Hurricane of 1926. For the next 15 years, the university struggled financially, bordering on insolvency. The first building on campus, now known as the Merrick Building, was left half built for over two decades due to the economic difficulties, requiring that classes be held off-campus at the nearby Anastasia Hotel in Coral Gables. Partitions separated the classrooms, giving the university the early but long since discarded nickname Cardboard College.

In 1929, University of Miami founding member William E. Walsh and other members of the university's board of regents resigned following the widespread collapse of Florida's economy. The university's plight was so severe that students went door to door in Coral Gables collecting funds to keep it open. A reconstituted ten-member board chaired by the university's first president Bowman Foster Ashe included Merrick, David Fairchild, James Cash Penney, and others. In 1930, several faculty members and more than 60 students entered the University of Miami when the University of Havana closed amidst political unrest in Cuba. While helpful to the University of Miami's early development, it still was not enough, and the university was forced to seek bankruptcy protection two years later, in 1932.

The troubles, however, were short-lived. In July 1934, the University of Miami was reincorporated and a board of trustees was installed, replacing the board of regents. By 1940, community leaders were replacing faculty and administration as trustees. During Ashe's presidency, the university grew considerably, adding the School of Law (1928), the School of Business (1929, renamed the Miami Herbert Business School in 2019), the School of Education (1929), the Graduate School (1941), the Marine Laboratory (1943, renamed the Rosenstiel School of Marine, Atmospheric, and Earth Science in 2022), the School of Engineering (1947), and the School of Medicine (1952).

During World War II, the University of Miami was one of only 131 colleges and universities nationally to participate in the V-12 Navy College Training Program, which offered students a path to commissioning as a U.S. Navy officer.

==== Jay F. W. Pearson (1952 until 1962) ====
In 1952, Jay F. W. Pearson, one of Ashe's long-time assistants, was appointed the University of Miami's second president. A charter faculty member and marine biologist, Pearson held the university's presidency for a decade, until 1962. Under Pearson's leadership, the University of Miami began awarding its first Ph.D. degrees, and student enrollment increased substantially, exceeding 4,000.

From 1961 until 1968, the university leased buildings on its south campus to the Central Intelligence Agency that were used in JMWAVE, a covert operation and intelligence gathering operation against Fidel Castro's communist government in Cuba. The university no longer owns land at the south campus.

In 1961, the university dropped its policy of racial segregation, and began admitting Black students and allowing their full participation in student activities and athletic teams. Five years later, in 1966, Ray Bellamy, a Black student at the University of Miami, became the first major Black college athlete in the Deep South to receive an athletic scholarship.

Until the early 1970s, as was widespread practice at colleges and universities nationally, the university regulated female student conduct more strictly than that of male students, including employing a staff under the Dean of Women charged with watching over female students. Under Pearson, however, the university began incrementally liberalizing these policies. In 1971, he consolidated the separate Dean of Men and Dean of Women positions in one. The same year, the university established a Women's Commission, which issued a 1974 report on the status of women on campus, leading to the university's first female commencement speaker, day care, and the launch of a Women's Study minor. Following enactment of Title IX in 1972 and over a decade of litigation, University of Miami organizations, including honorary societies, were opened to women's participation and inclusion. The Women's Commission also secured more equitable funding for women's sports. In 1973, Terry Williams Munz became the first woman in the nation awarded an athletic scholarship when she accepted a University of Miami golf scholarship.

==== Henry King Stanford (1962 until 1981) ====
Henry King Stanford, then president of Birmingham–Southern College, was appointed the University of Miami's third president in 1962. Stanford led an increased emphasis on the university's research, reorganization of its administrative structure, and construction of new campus facilities. New research centers established under Stanford included the Center for Advanced International Studies (1964), the Institute of Molecular and Cellular Evolution (1964), the Center for Theoretical Studies (1965), and the Institute for the Study of Aging (1975). In 1965, the University of Miami also began actively recruiting international students. Beginning with the 1968 football season, Stanford barred playing of "Dixie" by the university's band.

==== Edward T. Foote II (1981 until 2000) ====
Edward T. Foote II (right) with Miami-Dade County Mayor Alex Penelas in October 1998

In 1981, Edward T. Foote II, then dean of Washington University School of Law, was appointed the University of Miami's fourth president. Under his leadership, the university focused on attracting high-quality faculty and students, and consciously limited or reduced undergraduate admissions as part of its strategic plan. Foote also oversaw the conversion of on-campus student housing into residential colleges and the university launch of its largest fundraising campaign to date, a five-year, $400 million campaign that began in 1984 and exceeded that goal, raising $517.5 million. Foote established three new schools: the School of Architecture, the School of Communication, and the School of International Studies.

During Foote's tenure, the university's endowment increased nearly ten-fold, growing from $47.4 million in 1981 to $465.2 million in 2000.

==== Donna Shalala (2000 until 2015) ====
In November 2000, Foote was succeeded by Donna Shalala, former chancellor of the University of Wisconsin–Madison from 1988 to 1993 and U.S. secretary of Health and Human Services from 1993 to 2001, who was appointed the University of Miami's fifth president. Under Shalala, the University of Miami built new libraries, dormitories, symphony rehearsal halls, and classroom buildings. The university's academic quality continued improving, a trend that began in earnest under Foote.

Roughly a year into Shalala's presidency, on November 5, 2001, an 18-year-old University of Miami fraternity pledge drowned while attempting to swim across Lake Osceola, the campus lake, while intoxicated. Police reports later cited the student's dangerously high blood alcohol content in conjunction with dropping water temperatures and exhaustion as primary factors in his death, and two fraternity members who accompanied him were criminally charged with "negligence, breach of fiduciary duty, and breach of duty to aid and/or rescue."

In 2002, the University of Miami launched a new and even more ambitious multi-year fundraising campaign that ultimately raised $1.37 billion, the most ever raised by any university or college in Florida history as of 2008. From these proceeds, over half, $854 million, was allocated to construct and improve the University of Miami's Leonard M. School of Medicine medical campus. In November 2007, the University of Miami acquired Cedars Medical Center in Miami's Health District, renaming it University of Miami Hospital and giving the Miller School of Medicine its first dedicated in-house teaching hospital rather than having to rely on academic affiliations with area hospitals.

In 2003, Shalala controversially chose to close the University of Miami's North-South Center, a university research organization dedicated to the study of contemporary issues in Latin America and the Caribbean. The North-South Center was established by the U.S. Congress in 1984. It had secured a partnership with the Rand Corporation and was, as the Associated Press reported in 2003, "a respected public policy think tank specializing in Latin American and Caribbean issues including trade and economic policy, migration, security, public corruption, and the environment."

On September 30, 2004, the University of Miami hosted one of three nationally televised U.S. presidential debates between presidential candidates George W. Bush and John Kerry during the 2004 presidential election. The debate, moderated by Jim Lehrer of PBS NewsHour, was held on the University of Miami campus inside the Watsco Center. It drew 62.5 million viewers.

In February 2006, University of Miami custodial workers, who were contracted to the university through a Boston-based company, alleged unfair labor practices, substandard pay, lack of health benefits, and workplace safety concerns. They launched a strike that drew support from several University of Miami students, who began a hunger strike and on-campus vigil in support of it. The strike settled May 1, 2006 when a card count union vote was permitted and led to establishment of the first collective bargaining unit in the university's history. The university raised wages for its custodial workers from $6.40 to $8.35 per hour and provided health insurance.

In 2008 and 2009, partly stemming from the Great Recession, the university endowment experienced a loss of 26.8% of its capital and additional associated losses from diminished endowment income. The university responded by tightening expenditures. Damage from the endowment's negative performance was limited, however, because the university receives over 98 percent of its operating budget from non-endowment sources. In 2011, the university was ranked the nation's most fiscally responsible nonprofit organization in a Charity Navigator report published in collaboration with Worth magazine.

In 2013, Shalala approved the sale of donated environmentally sensitive land to commercial developers. After many lawsuits, the U of M and the developers were able to clear the land to build a Wal-Mart and other commercial operations.

==== Julio Frenk (2015 until 2024) ====
On April 13, 2015, the University of Miami announced the appointment of Julio Frenk, former dean of Harvard University School of Public Health and former Secretary of Health for the government of Mexico, as the university's sixth president. On March 10, 2016, the University of Miami hosted the 2016 Republican presidential primary's twelfth and final debate at BankUnited Center on the university campus, which aired nationally on CNN and drew 11.9 million viewers.

On June 12, 2024, the University of California, Los Angeles announced that Frenk would be joining UCLA as the university's chancellor six months later, on January 1, 2025. The same day, the University of Miami announced that the university's chief executive officer, Joe Echevarria, had been appointed acting president of the University of Miami "effective immediately." On June 19, 2024, the University of Miami student newspaper, The Miami Hurricane, labeled Frenk's departure "shocking", and criticized his leadership. "Frenk was rarely a prominent influence on UM's campus," the student newspaper reported.

In June 2024, the Los Angeles Times reported that Frenk's new salary at UCLA represented "a significant reduction from" his base pay of US$1.68 million at the time of his departure from the University of Miami.

Under Frenk's nine years of leadership of the University of Miami, the university's national ranking on U.S. News & World Report's ranking of national universities fell considerably from 48th in the nation upon his arrival in 2015 to 67th in the nation when he departed in 2024.

==== Joe Echevarria (2024 to present) ====
On October 18, 2024, the University of Miami Board of Trustees appointed Joe Echevarria, former chief executive officer of Deloitte and the university's interim president since June 12, 2024, as the seventh president of the University of Miami.

== Campus ==
=== Coral Gables campus ===
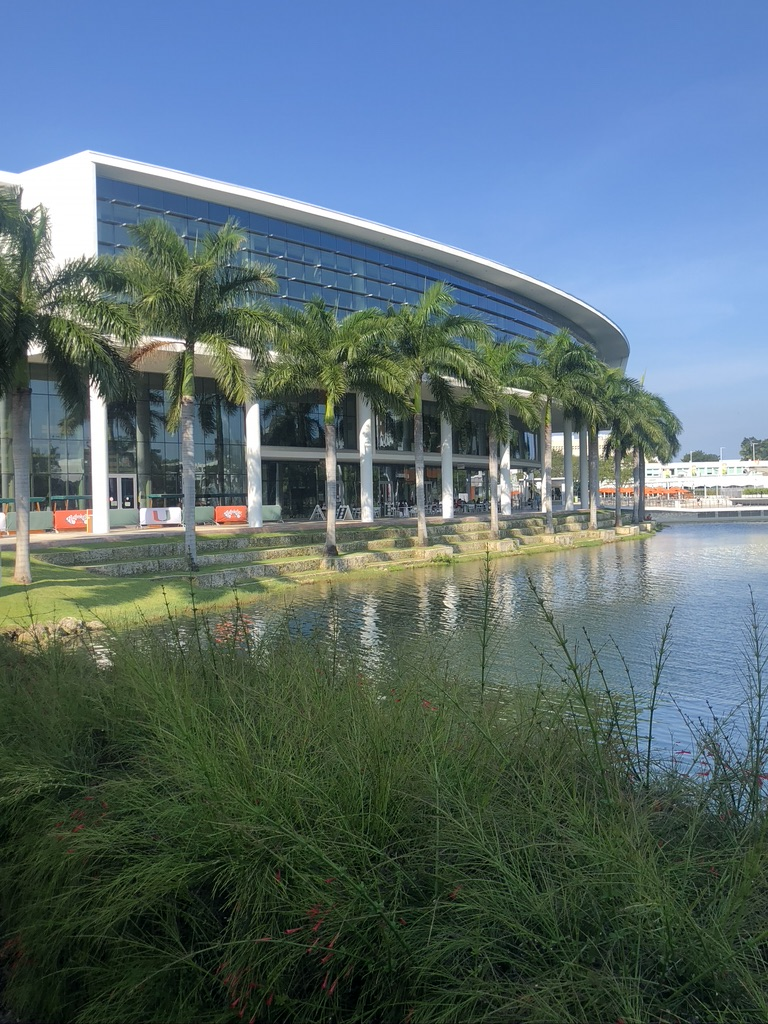
Shalala Student Center overlooking Lake Osceola on the University of Miami campus in September 2020

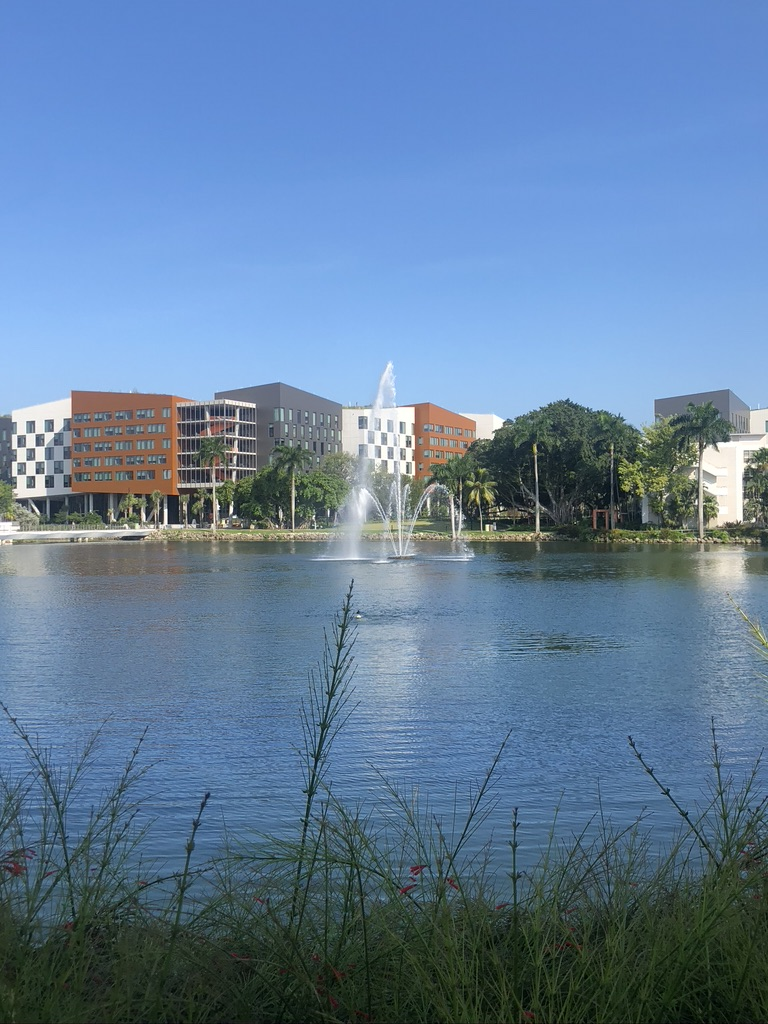
Lakeside Village, a University of Miami residential complex of 25 interconnected buildings, with Lake Osceola (in the foreground) in September 2020

The University of Miami's main campus spans 240 acres (0.97 km^{2}) in Coral Gables, 7 miles (11 km) southwest of Downtown Miami. Most of the university's academic programs are based on its main Coral Gables campus, which houses eight schools and two colleges, including the Frost School of Music, Herbert Business School, and the University of Miami School of Law. The campus has over 5,900,000 sq ft (550,000 m^{2}) of building space valued in excess of $657 million. Lake Osceola, a man-made freshwater lake developed in the late 1940s, is located at the center of campus.

The university's campus theater, Jerry Herman Ring Theatre, is named for University of Miami alumnus Jerry Herman, a composer and lyricist responsible for some of Broadway's most successful productions, including Hello Dolly!, La Cage aux Folles, and other Broadway hits.

The John C. Gifford Arboretum, a campus arboretum and botanical garden, is located on the northwest corner of the main Coral Gables campus. The Jorge M. Perez Architecture Center at the University of Miami's School of Architecture holds periodic architecture and design exhibitions.

Transportation to the Coral Gables campus is provided by Miami Metrorail, whose University Station stop is within walking distance of the campus. The Metro connects the University of Miami to Downtown Miami, Brickell, Coconut Grove, Civic Center, Miami International Airport, and other Miami neighborhoods. The University of Miami's Coral Gables campus is about a 15-minute train ride from Downtown and Brickell. The Hurry 'Canes shuttle bus service operates two routes on campus, including to University Station, and weekend routes to various off-campus stores and facilities during the academic year; an additional shuttle route provides service to the Rosenstiel School of Marine, Atmospheric, and Earth Science campus on Virginia Key and Vizcaya Station. The university also has a Zipcar service.

In February 2018, rap artist Drake filmed substantial portions of the music video for his song "God's Plan" on the University of Miami campus.

==== Student housing ====
The University of Miami's main campus in Coral Gables houses 4,590 enrolled students, 89 percent of whom are freshman. The university's on-campus housing consists of five residential colleges and one apartment-style housing area available only to undergraduate degree-seeking students. The residential colleges are divided into two dormitory-style residence halls and three suite-style residence halls: The first, McDonald and Pentland Towers of Hecht Residential College (demolished in 2022) and the Walsh and Rosborough Towers of Stanford Residential College, (demolished in 2024) are commonly referred to as the "Freshman Towers". The removal of these two dorms makes way for Centennial Village, which opened its first phase to students in the fall of 2024. Phase 2 is set to open in the fall of 2026. The second, Eaton Residential College, which originally housed only women, and Mahoney/Pearson Residential Colleges have suite-style housing with double-occupancy rooms connected by a shared bathroom.

In addition to these five residential colleges, the university campus includes a student residential area called University Village, which consists of seven buildings with apartment-style annual contract housing including fully furnished kitchen facilities. University Village is available only to juniors and seniors; until 2009, it had also been open to graduate and School of Law students.

Lakeside Village, a residential complex of 25 interconnected buildings, provides student housing for 1,115 sophomores, juniors, and seniors.

=== Medical school campus ===
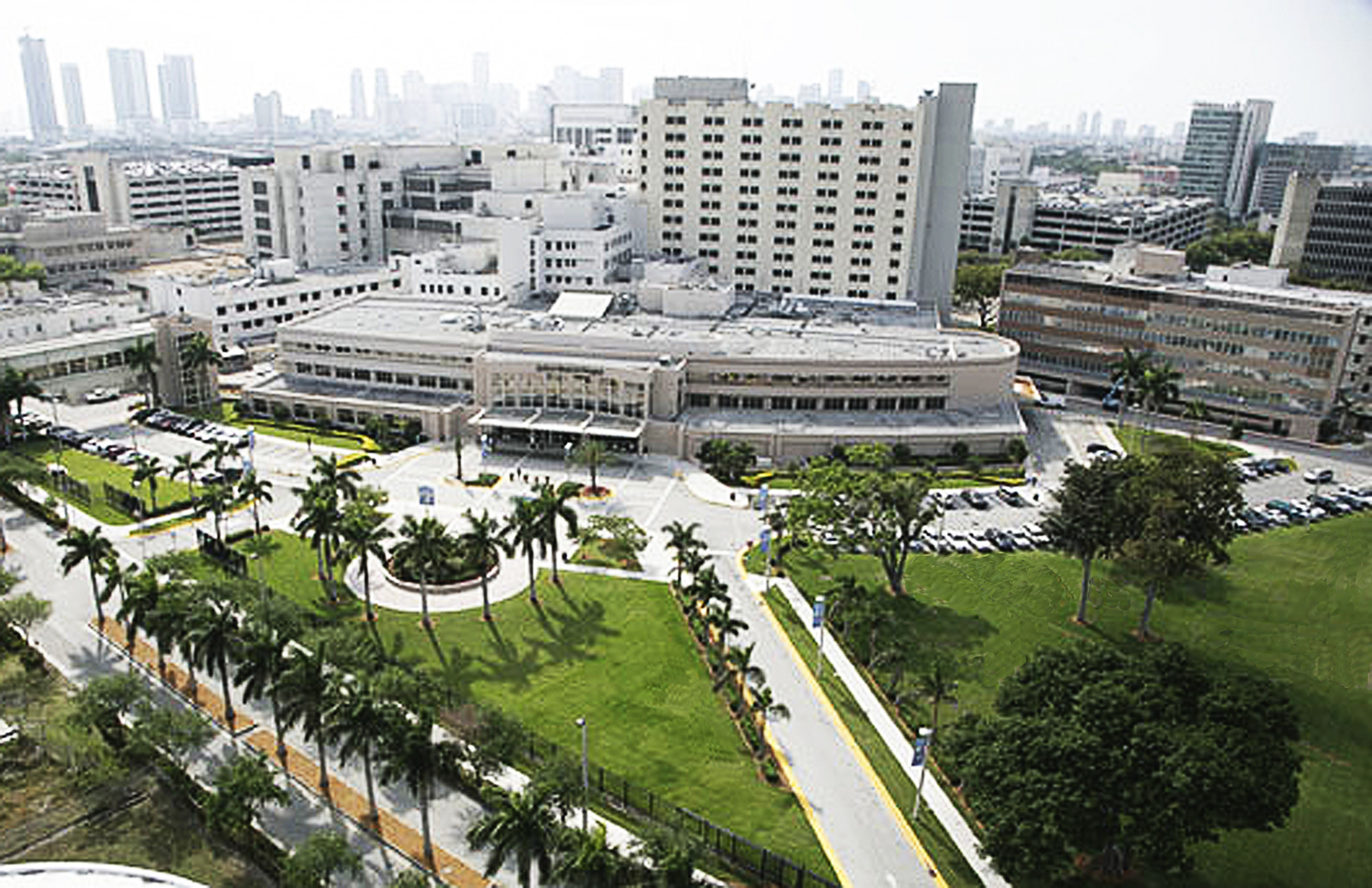
Jackson Memorial Hospital in Miami, the primary teaching hospital of the University of Miami's Miller School of Medicine and the largest hospital in the United States, with 1,547 beds

The University of Miami's Miller School of Medicine campus, located on Northwest 10th Avenue in Miami's Health District, has 1,681 full-time faculty and 785 students as of 2024. The campus includes 70 acres (280,000 m^{2}) within the University of Miami Jackson Memorial Medical Center's 153 acres (620,000 m^{2}) complex. As of 2024, two of its medical programs, Bascom Palmer Eye Institute (first in the nation) and neurology/neurosurgery (25-best in the nation), are nationally ranked.

The medical center includes three University of Miami-owned hospitals: University of Miami Hospital, Sylvester Comprehensive Cancer Center, and Anne Bates Leach Eye Hospital. Jackson Memorial Hospital, Holtz Children's Hospital, and Miami Veterans Affairs Medical Center are based on the medical center and maintain affiliations with the University of Miami but are not owned by the university. The heart of the School of Medicine campus, the original City of Miami Hospital that opened in 1918, is known colloquially as "The Alamo", and has been named to the National Register of Historic Places.

In 2006, the University of Miami opened a 300,000 sq ft (28,000 m^{2}), 15-story Clinical Research Building and Wellness Center. In 2007, the university purchased Cedars Medical Center and renamed it University of Miami Hospital. Situated in Miami's Health District, the hospital is close to Jackson Memorial Hospital, which is used by University of Miami medical students and faculty to provide patient care.

In 2009, a LEED-certified nine-story biomedical research building, a 182,000 sq ft (16,900 m^{2}) laboratory, and an office facility were opened to house the University of Miami's Interdisciplinary Stem Cell Institute and its John P. Hussman Institute for Human Genomics. The University of Miami has completed a 2,000,000 sq ft (190,000 m^{2}) Life Science Park adjacent to the university's medical campus that houses medical offices and laboratories. The University of Miami's medical campus is connected to the university's main campus by the Metrorail with direct stations at University Station for the main Coral Gables campus and Civic Center Station for the medical campus.

=== Rosenstiel School of Marine and Atmospheric Science campus ===
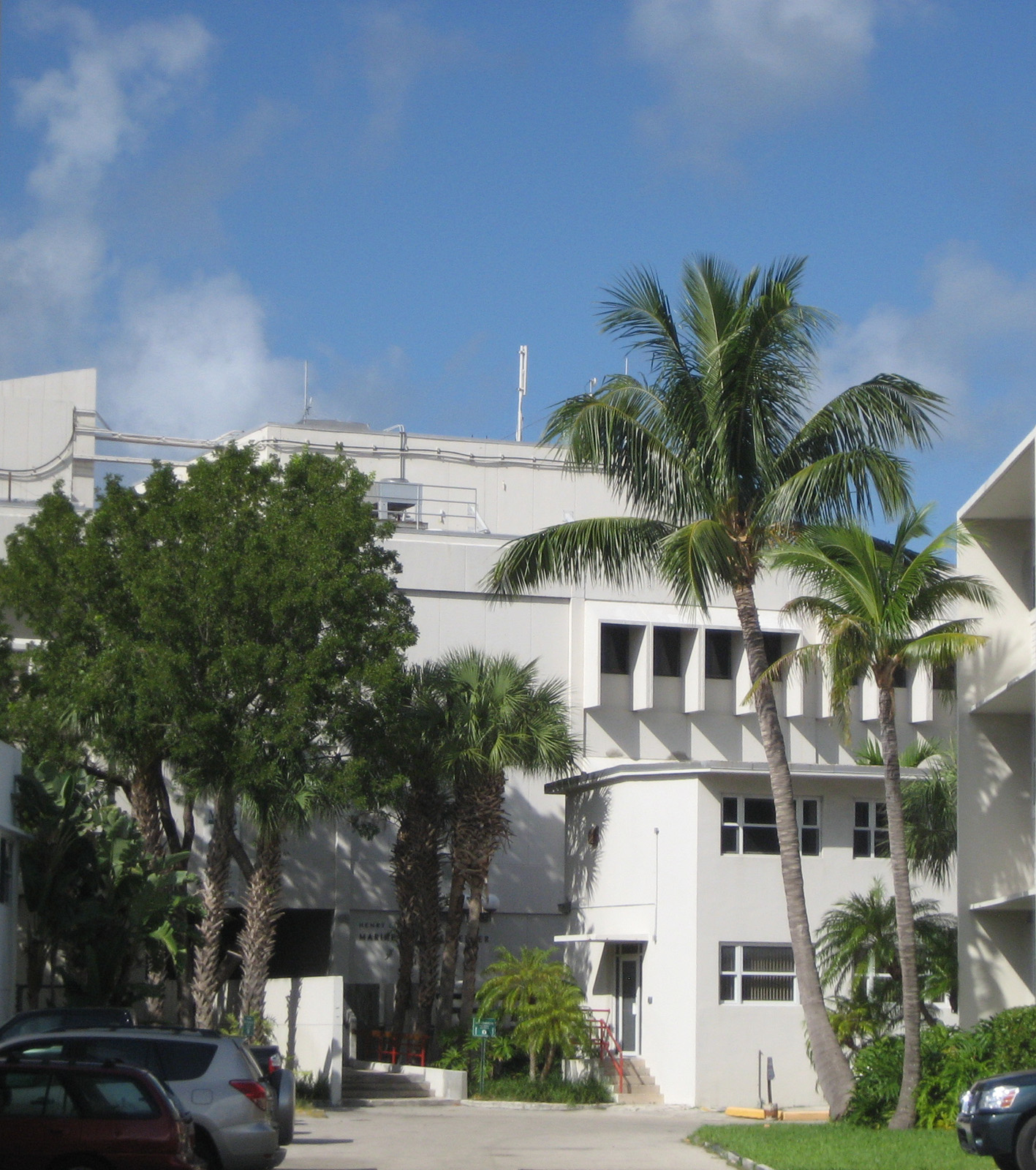
The Applied Marine Physics Building at the University of Miami's Rosenstiel School of Marine, Atmospheric, and Earth Science on Virginia Key, in September 2007

The University of Miami's Rosenstiel School of Marine, Atmospheric, and Earth Science maintains its 18 acres (73,000 m^{2}) campus on the Biscayne Bay waterfront on Virginia Key. It is the only subtropical marine and atmospheric research institute in the continental United States. The school is home to the world's largest hurricane simulation tank. The Atlantic Oceanographic and Meteorological Laboratory, a federal research laboratory, maintains its headquarters next to the Rosenstiel School campus on Rickenbacker Causeway and collaborates on various academic projects with the Rosenstiel School.

The school maintains the Barbados Atmospheric Chemistry Observatory (BACO), a research facility on the eastern end of Barbados in the Caribbean. The facility researches the summertime transport of dust particles from the Sahara in North Africa across the Atlantic Ocean to the Caribbean Basin and South America.

The school's origins date back to 1945 when construction began on Rickenbacker Causeway to make Virginia Key accessible by car. During the causeway's construction, Miami-Dade County offered the university a part of the island adjacent to Miami Seaquarium in exchange for it agreeing to assume operational management of the aquarium. In 1951, however, the aquarium's construction was delayed following the failure of a bond referendum designed to fund it, and the university instead chose to begin leasing the land from the county. In 1953, the university built classroom and lab buildings on a 16-acre (6.5 ha) campus to house what would become the University of Miami's Rosenstiel School of Marine and Atmospheric Science (RSMAS). Additional buildings were added in 1957, 1959, and 1965.

From 1947 to 1959, the State of Florida funded the University of Miami Marine Lab on Virginia Key until the state completed construction of its own marine laboratory in St. Petersburg.

Since 1951, the school has published the Bulletin of Marine Science, a peer-reviewed scientific journal on ecology, fisheries management, geology, geophysics, marine biology, oceanography, meteorology, and related topics.

In 2009, the University of Miami received a $15 million federal grant to help construct a 56,500 square feet (5,250 m^{2}) Marine Technology and Life Sciences Seawater Research Building on the Rosenstiel School campus.

=== South and Richmond campuses ===
In 1946, following the U.S. military's deactivation of Richmond Naval Air Station in southwestern Miami, the University of Miami acquired the 12 mi (19 km) facility to accommodate its vast increase in post-World War II students. The property included classrooms, housing, and other amenities capable of accommodating approximately 1,100 students. Two years later, in 1948, the property was repurposed by the University of Miami as a research facility. In the 1960s, the university opted to lease some of its buildings to the Central Intelligence Agency. Another section of the property, established in 1948, was called South Campus and included a 350 acres (1,400,000 m^{2}) plot used for university-sponsored agricultural and horticultural research. For 20 years, the University of Miami used radioactive isotopes in biological research on the South Campus and buried these radioactive materials, including animals eradicated in research, on the site. In August 2006, the University of Miami agreed to reimburse the U.S. Army Corps of Engineers $393,473 for clean up costs at the site made available under the 1980 Superfund law. Six buildings on the site provide 63,800 sq ft (5,930 m^{2}) and currently house the Global Public Health Research Group, Miami Institute for Human Genomics, and Forensic Toxicology Laboratory. The University of Miami once considered building a south campus on the property but instead opted in 2014 to sell the 80 acres of land.

The Richmond campus is a 76 acres (310,000 m^{2}) site that was formerly the United States Naval Observatory Secondary National Time Standard Facility, which already had buildings and a 20M antenna used for long interferometry. The University of Miami's Rosenstiel School's Center for Southeastern Tropical Advanced Remote Sensing and Richmond Satellite Operations Center (RSOC) maintain their research facilities on part of this campus.

=== Libraries ===
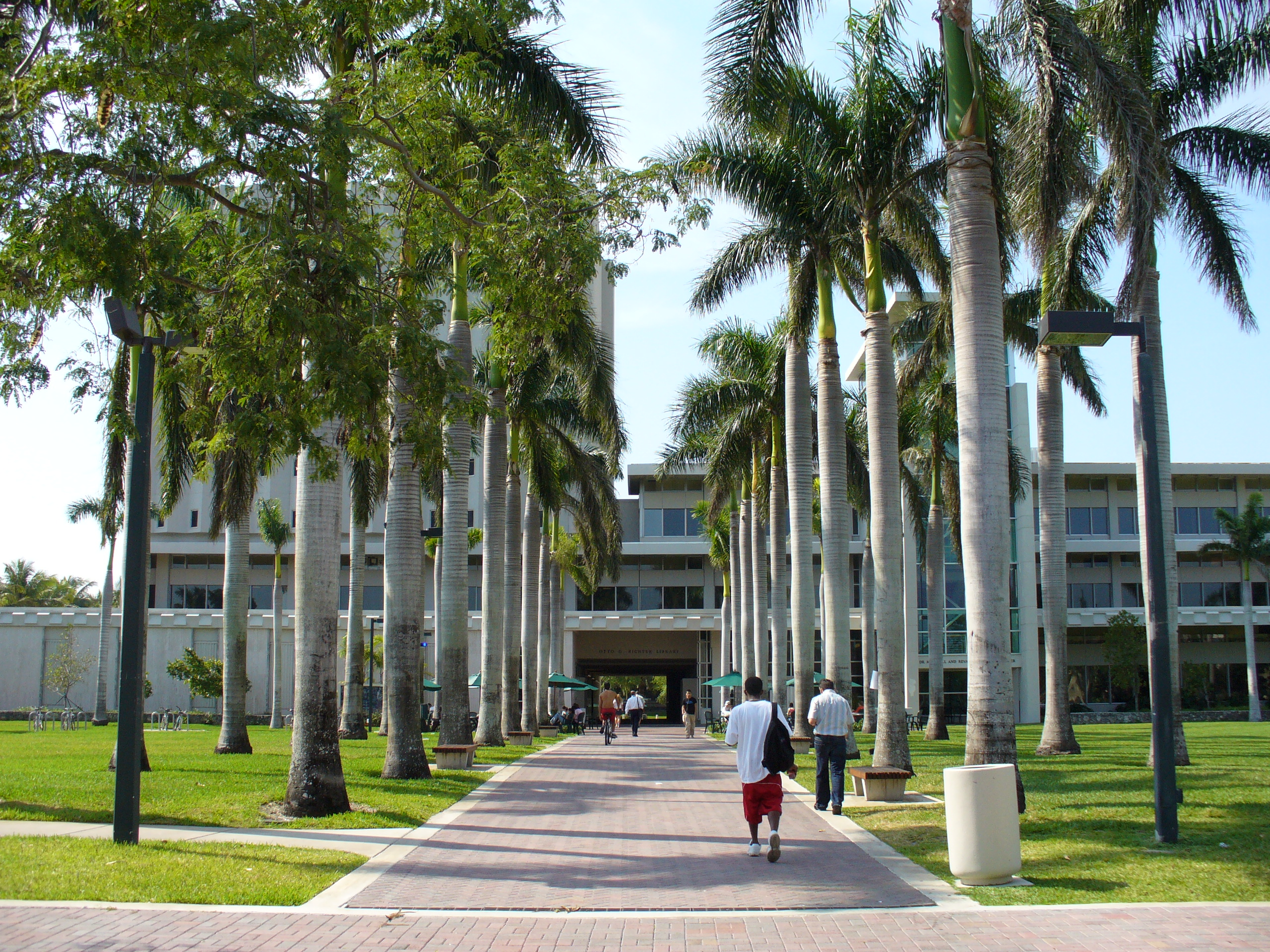
Walkway leading to the Otto G. Richter Library on the University of Miami campus, in April 2006

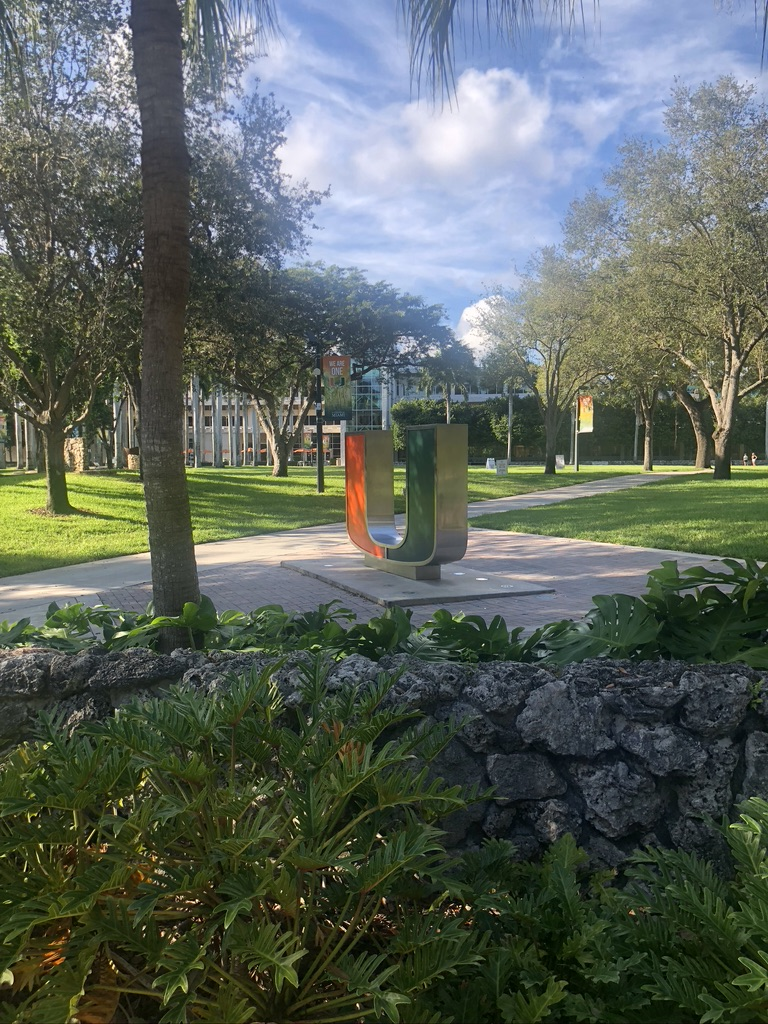
The Richter Library (background) with University Foote Green and the U Statue (foreground) on the University of Miami campus, in November 2020

The University of Miami maintains one of the nation's largest university library systems, which currently consists of over four million volumes, over four million microforms, over 1.6 million electronic books, 165,658 active serials titles, 165,045 electronic journals, and 218,797 audio, film, video, and cartographic materials across eight libraries as of 2024. The University of Miami's libraries have a staff of 71 librarians, 33 professional staff, and 76 support staff.

Four of the University of Miami's libraries are located on the Coral Gables campus: Otto G. Richter Library, the university's primary interdisciplinary library, the Architecture Research Center at the School of Architecture, the Judi Prokop Newman Information Resource Center at the Herbert Business School, and the Marta and Austin Weeks Library at Frost School of Music.

The Miller School of Medicine's main library, Louis Calder Memorial Library, is located on Northwest 10th Avenue on the medical campus in the Miami Health District. The medical school also maintains and manages two specialized medical libraries, The Mary and Edward Norton Library focused on ophthalmology and the Pomerance Library focused on psychiatry. The Rosenstiel School of Marine and Atmospheric Science Library is based on the Rosentiel School's campus on Virginia Key.

Otto G. Richter Library, the largest of the university's libraries on the Coral Gables campus, houses art, architecture, humanities, social sciences, and science collections. The Richter Library also serves as a depository for federal and state government publications. Rare books, maps, manuscript collections, and the University of Miami Archives are housed in the library's Special Collections Division. The Richter's Cuban Heritage Collection, which specializes in Cuba-related collections, maintains the world's largest Cuba-related holdings outside of Cuba.

In January 2017, the Jay I. Kislak Foundation announced it was making a substantial donation of rare books, maps, and manuscripts to the university's libraries. In preparation for the extensive donation, the University of Miami renovated a former lecture hall, now called the Kislak Center at the University of Miami, to house the works and the university's existing special collections and archives. Among the vast holdings in the university's Kislak Center are Christopher Columbus' original published copies of his letter on the first voyage aboard the Niña, which Columbus authored on February 15, 1493.

== Academics ==
The University of Miami currently employs 2,850 full-time faculty members with 99 percent of them holding either doctorates or terminal degrees in their respective specialties. The university's student-faculty ratio, as of 2024, was 12:1.

=== Accreditations ===
The University of Miami is a broadly accredited academic institution, including by the Southern Association of Colleges and Schools and the Florida Department of Education and 26 additional programmatic accrediting bodies, including Accreditation Council for Graduate Medical Education, American Bar Association, American Dental Association Commission on Dental Accreditation, American Physical Therapy Association Commission on Accreditation in Physical Therapy Education, American Psychological Association, Association of MBAs (AMBA), Association to Advance Collegiate Schools of Business (ACSB International), Commission on Accreditation of Healthcare Management Education, Commission on Collegiate Nursing Education, Council on Education for Public Health, EQUIS, Liaison Committee on Medical Education, National Association of Schools of Music, and Society for Simulation in Healthcare.

The university is a member of American Association of Colleges and Universities, American Association of University Women, American Council of Learned Societies, American Council on Education, Florida Association of Colleges and Universities, Independent Colleges and Universities of Florida, and National Association of Independent Colleges and Universities.

In September 2022, Miami Herbert Business School was awarded AMBA accreditation, securing triple crown accreditation status, which includes accreditation by each of the nation's three business-oriented academic accrediting bodies: ACSB International, AMBA, and EQUIS. Less than one percent of the world's business schools have been recognized with accreditation from all three of these academic accrediting bodies.

=== Undergraduate admissions ===
Undergraduate admission statistics
	Fall 2025	Fall 2024	Fall 2023	Fall 2022	Fall 2021
First-time Freshmen
Applicants	58,167	53,954	48,286	49,167	42,244
Admits	10,245	10,195	8,940	9,311	12,036
Admit rate	18%	19%	19%	19%	28%
Enrolled	2,686	2,473	2,328	2,370	2,766
Yield rate	26%	24%	26%	25%	23%
Transfers
Applicants	2,421	2,326	2,536	3,530	3,277
Admits	1,343	1,242	1,303	1,477	1,449
Admit rate	55%	53%	51%	42%	44%
Enrolled	576	502	545	597	637
Yield rate	43%	40%	42%	40%	44%

Among the Class of 2028 enrolled as of fall 2024, the mean SAT score was 1400 and the mean ACT score was 31. The average GPA was 3.8 on a 4.0 scale.

The University of Miami attracts students from around the world and nation. As of 2024, 18 percent of University of Miami undergraduates were from the Miami metropolitan area, 10 percent were from other parts of Florida, 65 percent were from other U.S. states, and seven percent were international students from outside the United States. Among graduate students, 38 percent were from the Miami metropolitan area, 13 percent were from other parts of Florida, 31 percent were from other U.S. states, and 17 percent were international students. As of November 2020, the University of Miami ranks eleventh nationally in combined diversity across racial, geographic, gender and age factors.

The University of Miami's freshman retention rate is 93%, with 84% going on to graduate within six years. As of 2015, the university reported that 73 percent of undergraduates graduated within four years, 82 percent graduated within five years, and 84 percent graduated within six years. Male student athletes and female student athletes have graduation rates of 56 percent and 67 percent, respectively, within six years.

Enrollment in UM (2017–2023)
Academic year	Undergraduates	Graduate	Total enrollment
2017–2018	10,832	6,171	17,003
2018–2019	11,117	6,214	17,331
2019–2020	11,307	6,504	17,811
2020–2021	11,334	6,475	17,809
2021–2022	12,089	7,007	19,096
2022–2023	12,504	6,898	19,402

=== Organization ===
The University of Miami is managed by a board of trustees that includes 48 elected members, three alumni representatives, 23 senior members, four national members, six ex officio members, 14 emeriti members, and one student representative. Ex officio members, who serve by virtue of their positions in the university, include the university's current president, the president and immediate past president of the university's citizens board, and the president, president-elect, and immediate past president of the university's alumni association. Since 1982, the board has developed eleven visiting committees, which include both trustees and outside experts to assist in overseeing the university's 12 academic units.

Each of the University of Miami's 12 schools and colleges within the university is managed by a dean.

Undergraduate and graduate

- College of Arts and Sciences
- College of Engineering
- Frost School of Music
- Herbert Business School
- Rosenstiel School of Marine, Atmospheric, and Earth Science
- School of Architecture
- School of Communication
- School of Education and Human Development
- School of Nursing and Health Studies

Graduate only

- Miller School of Medicine
- The Graduate School
- University of Miami School of Law

The University of Miami's also maintains a division of continuing and international education and an executive education program in the Herbert Business School.

Under a partnership with nearby Florida International University, students from both schools are permitted to take graduate classes at either university, affording graduate students at both universities a wider range of course selections.

The University of Miami's startup ecosystem, called The Launch Pad, assists entrepreneurial University of Miami students of all majors in obtaining assistance in starting, building, and scaling their own business. The program offers startup and business law-related legal assistance for student businesses in coordination with the University of Miami School of Law. The University of Miami also maintains an angel investor network, called Cane Angel Network, that allows university-affiliated investors to fund entrepreneurs with ties to the university.

Student body composition as of May 2, 2022
Race and ethnicity	Total
White	42%
Hispanic	23%
Foreign national	13%
Black	9%
Other (Note: Other consists of Multiracial Americans and those who prefer not provide demographic information.)	7%
Asian	5%
Economic diversity
Low-income (Note: The percentage of students who received an income-based federal Pell Grant intended for low-income students.)	13%
Affluent (Note: The percentage of students whose income is at or exceeding that of the American middle class.)	87%

In addition to its medical degree program, the University of Miami's Miller School of Medicine offers separate PhD and combined MD/PhD degrees in several biomedical sciences. The University of Miami's Department of Community Service, staffed by volunteer medical students and physicians from the medical school, provide free medical and other community services in Miami and surrounding communities.

=== Attendance costs ===
2018–2019 tuition
School	Tuition	Total cost
Undergraduate	$50,226	$68,458
Graduate school	$37,624	$64,776
Law school	$52,390	$80,168
Medical school (in-state Florida residents)	$40,494	$69,051
Medical school (non-Florida residents)	$44,107	$72,664

For the 2022–2023 academic year, the University of Miami reported that the estimated total annual cost of attendance for full-time undergraduate students residing on campus was $78,640; the estimated total annual cost of attendance for full-time undergraduate students residing in University Village or off-campus was $83,260; and the estimated total annual cost of attendance for full-time undergraduate students residing with parents or relatives was $69,160.

=== Rankings ===
In its 2026 edition of "America's Best Colleges", U.S. News & World Report ranks the University of Miami 64th among all national universities. Also in 2023, U.S. News ranks the Miller School of Medicine the nation's 44th-best medical school. In its "2023 Best Law Schools" report, U.S. News ranks the School of Law the nation's 71st-best law school.

In 2022, the Academic Ranking of World Universities ranked the University of Miami the ninth-best university in the world for oceanography and the 25th-best university in the world for business administration.

In 2018, U.S. News & World Report ranked the University of Miami Physical Therapy Department the nation's 10th-best physical therapy program and its Department of Psychology Clinical Training Program the nation's 25th best for psychology.

Academic rankings

National
- Forbes: 100
- U.S. News & World Report: 64
- Washington Monthly: 252
- WSJ/College Pulse: 47

Global
- ARWU: 301–400
- QS: 314 (tie)
- THE: 201–250
- U.S. News & World Report: 234 (tie)

National program rankings
Program	Ranking
Biological Sciences	90
Business	72
Chemistry	106
Clinical Psychology	18
Earth Sciences	64
Economics	83
Education	73
Engineering	102
English	99
Fine Arts	124
Health Care Management	20
History	91
Law	73
Mathematics	86
Medicine: Research	45
Medicine: Primary Care	93–123
Nursing–Anesthesia	88
Nursing: Master's	27
Nursing: DNP	31
Physical Therapy	20
Physics	124
Psychology	60
Public Affairs	101
Public Health	56
Sociology	80

Global subject rankings
Program	Ranking
Biology & Biochemistry	308
Cardiac & Cardiovascular Systems	147
Clinical Medicine	97
Engineering	720
Environment/Ecology	210
Geosciences	89
Immunology	178
Molecular Biology & Genetics	142
Neuroscience & Behavior	103
Oncology	163
Plant & Animal Science	295
Psychiatry/Psychology	88
Social Sciences & Public Health	290
Surgery	67

=== Research ===
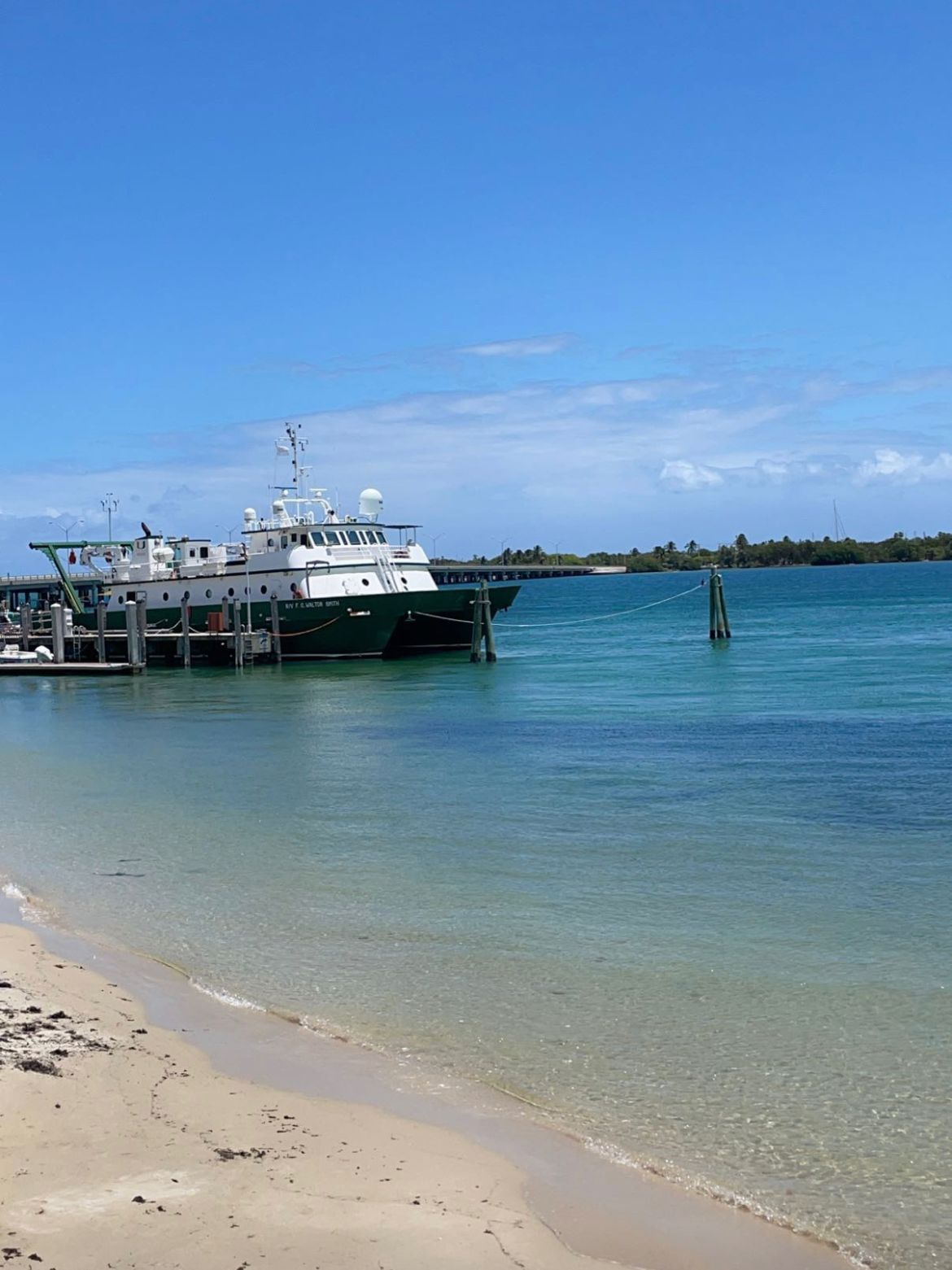
The F.G. Walton Smith, a research catamaran, at the University of Miami's Rosenstiel School of Marine, Atmospheric, and Earth Science, in May 2022

The University of Miami is classified among "Doctoral Universities: Very High Research Activity" and ranks 67th among all U.S. universities in research and sponsored programs expenditures, which totaled $456 million in 2023.

In addition to research conducted in its individual academic schools and departments, the University of Miami maintains several university-wide research centers, including:

- Abess Center for Ecosystem Science and Policy seeks to bridge the gap between science and environmental policy.
- Center for Research and Education for Aging and Technology Enhancement (CREATE) explores strategies to improve the quality of life for older adults.
- Computational Science Center is a data center that conducts data-driven research to identify solutions to various world problems and challenges.
- European Union Center, a designated European Union Center for Excellence, is a consortium between the University of Miami and Florida International University established in 2001 with a European Commission grant to promote and research economic, social, and political issues of interest to the European Union.
- Institute for Cuban and Cuban-American Studies (ICCAS) provides academic and cultural research and insight on Cuba.
- John P. Hussman Institute for Human Genomics researches causes of Parkinson's disease, Alzheimer's disease, macular degeneration, and other diseases and explores human genome and other possible cures and treatments for them.
- The Sue and Leonard Miller Center for Contemporary Judaic Studies provides objective, in-depth exploration of issues and trends that have affected the Jewish people over the last century.
- The Wallace H. Coulter Center focuses on turning translational research in biomedical science and engineering into products that address unmet clinical needs and have market potential in the healthcare and biomedical industries.

The University of Miami's Miller School of Medicine receives more than $200 million annually in external grants and contracts to fund 1,500 ongoing projects. The medical campus includes more than 500,000 sq ft (46,000 m^{2}) of research space and the University of Miami's Life Science Park provides an additional 2,000,000 sq ft (190,000 m^{2}) of space adjacent to the university's medical campus in Miami's Health District. University of Miami's Interdisciplinary Stem Cell Institute researches the biology of stem cells and translates basic research into new regenerative therapies.

The University of Miami houses one of the nation's largest centralized academic cyberinfrastructures. In 2007, the university launched the Center for Computational Science High Performance Computing group. Since then, the group has grown from a zero HPC cyberinfrastructure to a regional high-performance computing environment that currently supports more than 1,200 users, 220 TFlops of computational power, and more than three petabytes of disk storage.

As of 2008, the University of Miami's Rosenstiel School of Marine, Atmospheric, and Earth Science receives $50 million in annual external research funding. Their laboratories include a saltwater wave tank, a five tank conditioning and spawning system, a multi-tank Aplysia culture laboratory, controlled corals climate tanks, and DNA profiling equipment. The campus also houses an invertebrate museum with 400,000 specimens. The University of Miami operates the Bimini Biological Field Station in Bimini district in the western Bahamas, an array of oceanographic high-frequency radar along the East Coast of the United States, and a Bermuda-based aerosol observatory. The university owns Little Salt Spring, a National Register of Historic Places site, in North Port, Florida, where the Rosenstiel School performs archaeological and paleontological research.

In 2010, the University of Miami built a brain imaging annex to the James M. Cox Jr. Science Center within the College of Arts and Sciences, which includes a functional magnetic imaging (fMRI) system and a laboratory where scientists, clinicians, and engineers study fundamental aspects of brain function. Construction of the lab was funded in part by a $14.8 million stimulus grant from the National Institutes of Health (NIH).

In 2016, the University of Miami received $195 million in federal research funding, including $131.3 million from the U.S. Department of Health and Human Services and $14.1 million from the National Science Foundation. The University of Miami's Miller School of Medicine received a record $149.5 million in NIH funding in 2019, making the Miller School of Medicine the world's 39th-largest NIH grant recipient institution and largest NIH grant recipient of any medical school in Florida.

Also in 2016, the university received $161 million in science and engineering funding from the U.S. federal government, making the university the largest Hispanic-serving recipient and 56th-largest recipient of federal science and engineering funding. Within the $161 million in funding, $117 million was granted by the U.S. Department of Health and Human Services to the university's school of medicine.

== Student life ==
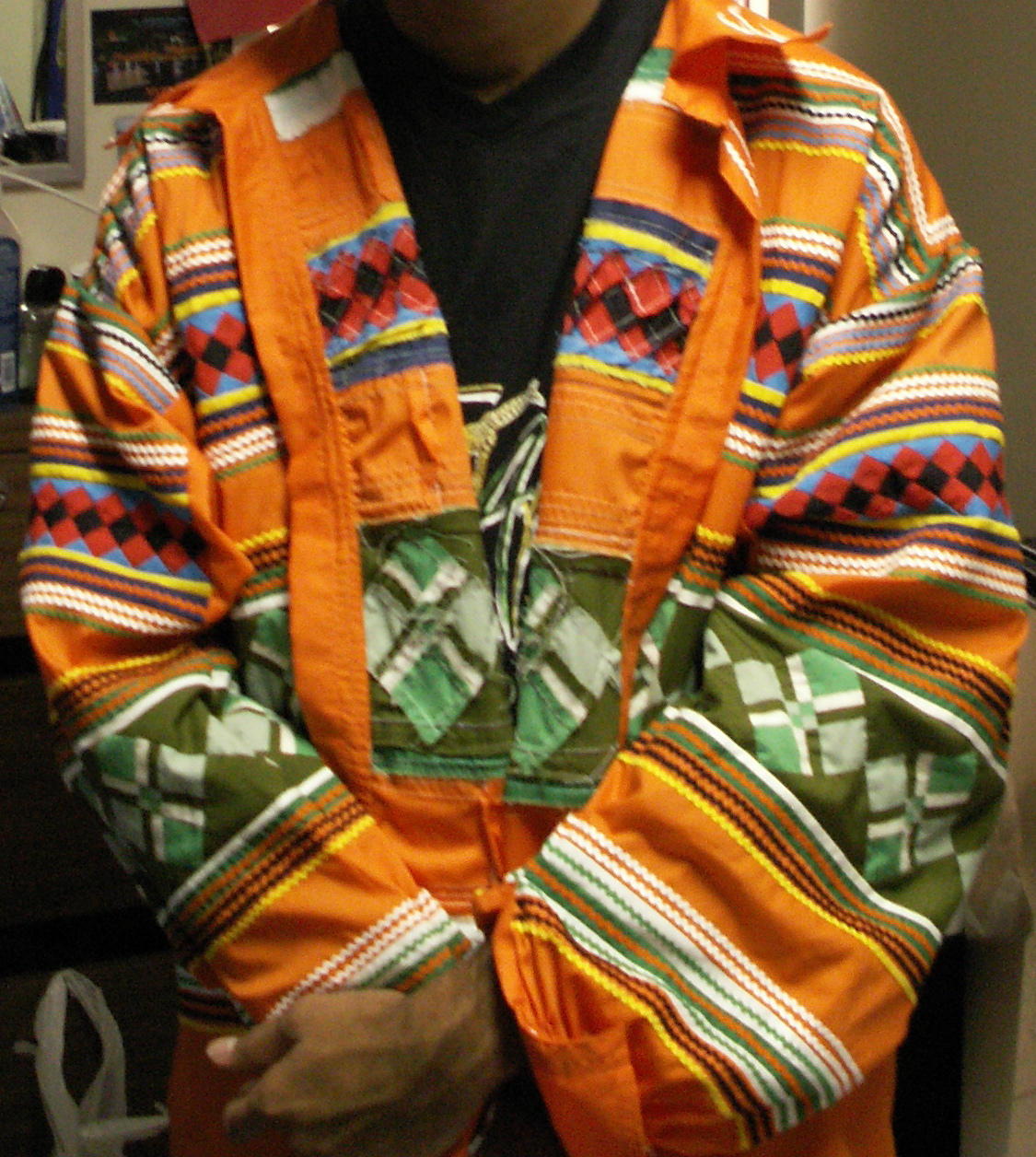
The distinctive Seminole patchwork jackets worn by members of the University of Miami's Iron Arrow Honor Society, the highest honor bestowed by the university

The University of Miami is affiliated with 31 social fraternities and sororities. Multicultural fraternities and sororities include six of the nine historically African-American organizations that are collectively known as the Divine Nine, Latino, and Asian-interest fraternities and sororities.

The University of Miami has over 300 registered student organizations, including Amnesty International, Habitat for Humanity, the Ibis yearbook, UMTV (an award-winning cable television channel with nine programs broadcast on Comcast Channel 96), UniMiami (a Spanish cable television broadcast), the student-run Distraction Magazine, and the campus radio station WVUM, which has broadcast to the Miami metropolitan media market continuously since 1967. Since 1929, students have published The Miami Hurricane, which is currently published weekly and has been named to the Associated Collegiate Press Hall of Fame.

== Athletics ==
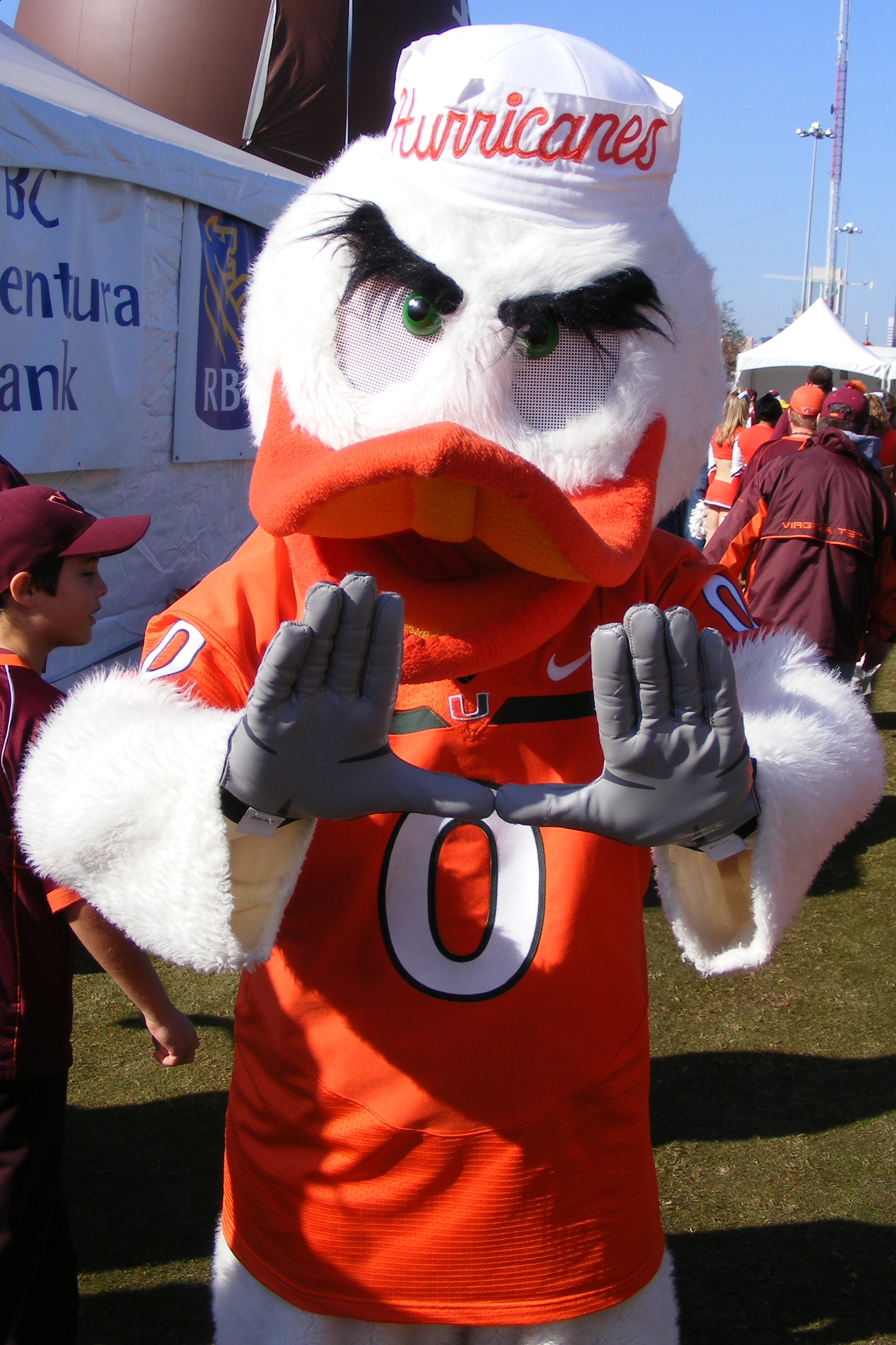
University of Miami mascot Sebastian the Ibis makes the signature "The U" hand gesture, in December 2007.

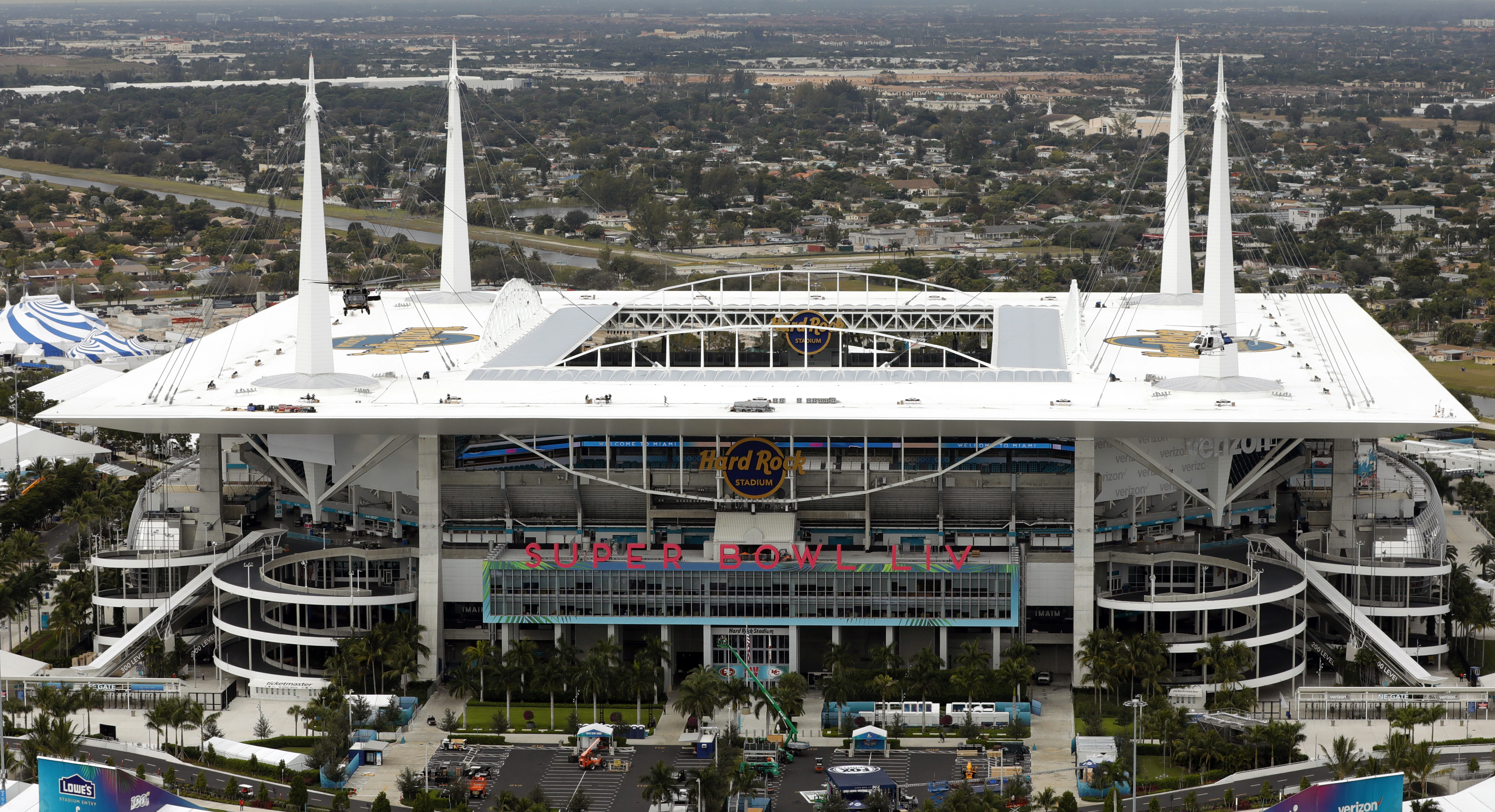
Hard Rock Stadium in Miami Gardens, home field for the five-time national champion Miami Hurricanes football team

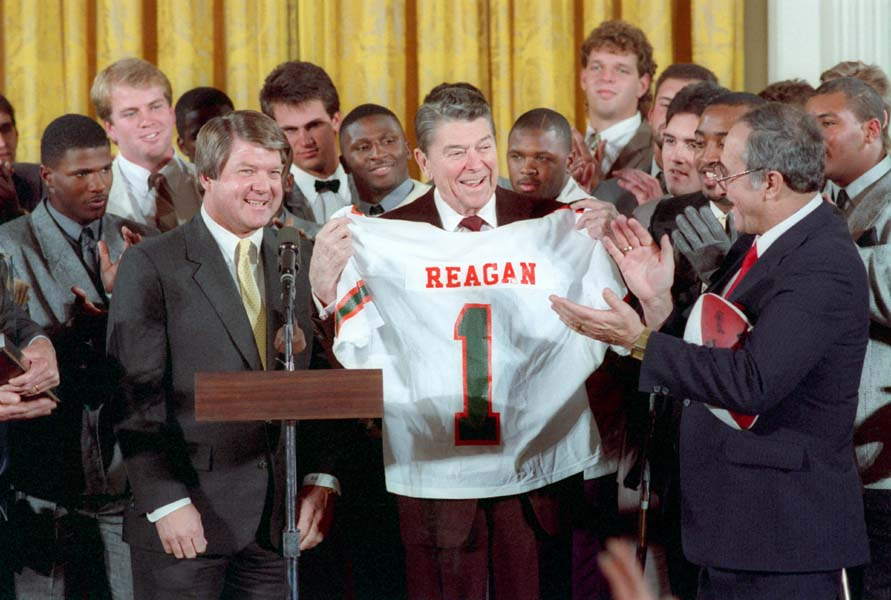
Jimmy Johnson and the 1987 Miami Hurricanes football team present U.S. president Ronald Reagan with a University of Miami jersey at the White House after winning their second national championship, in January 1988

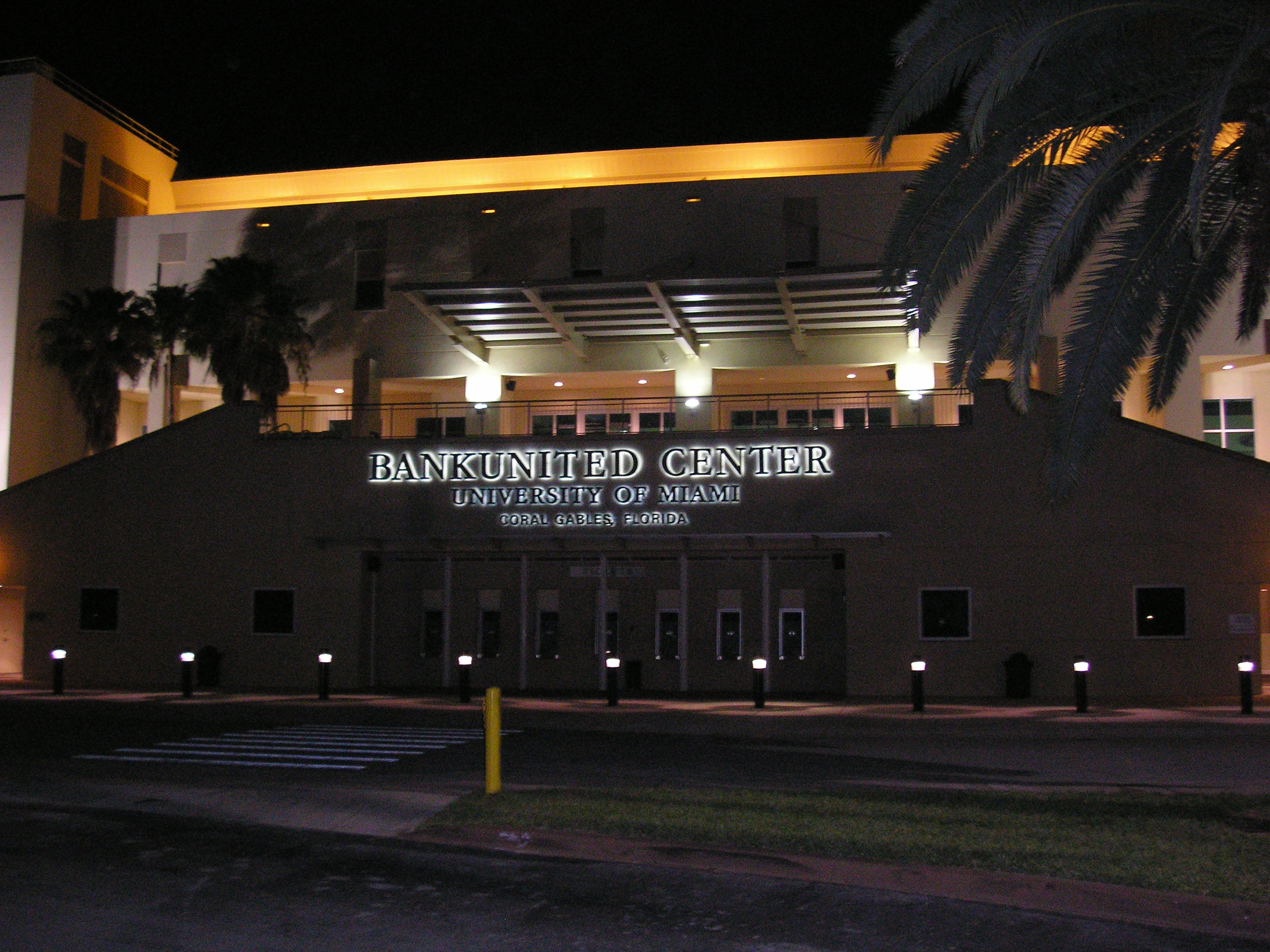
Watsco Center, which opened in 2003 on the University of Miami campus, home arena of the University of Miami's men's and women's basketball teams

The University of Miami's athletic teams are the Miami Hurricanes and are widely referred to as "The 'Canes" or "The U". The Hurricanes are members of NCAA Division I, the highest level of athletics sanctioned by the National Collegiate Athletic Association (NCAA), and compete primarily in the Atlantic Coast Conference (ACC). Prior to joining the ACC in 2004, the University of Miami competed in the Big East Conference. The Hurricanes maintain seven NCAA men's athletics teams (baseball, basketball, cross-country, diving, football, tennis, and track and field) and ten women's teams (basketball, cross-country, diving, golf, rowing, soccer, swimming, tennis, track and field, and volleyball).

The University of Miami's mascot, first introduced in 1957, is Sebastian the Ibis. The university's marching band, established in 1933, is called Band of the Hour.

=== Football ===
The University of Miami football team has won five national championships in 1983, 1987, 1989, 1991, and 2001 and has appeared in the AP Top 25 frequently since the 1980s. University of Miami football alumni include eleven members of the Pro Football Hall of Fame, two Heisman Trophy winners, and dozens of players who have gone on to NFL careers. As of 2024, at least one University of Miami football player has been selected in the NFL draft in 49 consecutive NFL drafts, dating back to 1975. Among all colleges and universities, the University of Miami holds all-time records for most defensive linemen (49) and is tied with USC for most wide receivers (40) to go on to play at the NFL level.

Beginning in the 1980s with the arrival of former head coach Howard Schnellenberger, the University of Miami football became one of the nation's most high profile and elite college football programs and developed a large fandom. Its success has been accompanied with controversy, notably having three national championships in the 1980s followed by scandal-related damage to its recruiting capabilities, a subsequent comeback leading to its 2001 national championship, followed by a second scandal-plagued descent.

Much of the program's dramatic history from the 1980s is captured in a widely viewed December 12, 2009, ESPN documentary, The U, which drew 2.3 million viewers, then making it the most watched documentary in ESPN history. A 2014 sequel, The U Part 2, picked up where The U left off, covering the University of Miami as it launched a comeback from these 1980s scandals leading up to its 2001 national championship team, widely considered one of the best, and possibly the best team, in college football history, followed by yet a second series of widespread scandals that cost scholarships and inflicted multi-year damage on the program's competitiveness.

The Hurricanes play their home games at Hard Rock Stadium in Miami Gardens. In 2007, the university signed a 25-year contract for the team to play at Hard Rock Stadium through 2033. Prior to moving to Hard Rock Stadium, from 1937 through 2007, the Hurricanes played their home football games at the Miami Orange Bowl in Little Havana.

=== Baseball ===
Like its football program, the University of Miami baseball team has proven one of the most successful in the nation over the past four decades, winning four national championships in 1982, 1985, 1999, and 2001. Multiple Miami Hurricanes baseball players have gone on to professional careers in Major League Baseball.

The Hurricanes' baseball team plays their home games at Alex Rodriguez Park at Mark Light Field, an on-campus baseball stadium named for New York Yankees third baseman Alex Rodriguez, who contributed $3.9 million toward the stadium's renovation.

=== Men's and women's basketball ===
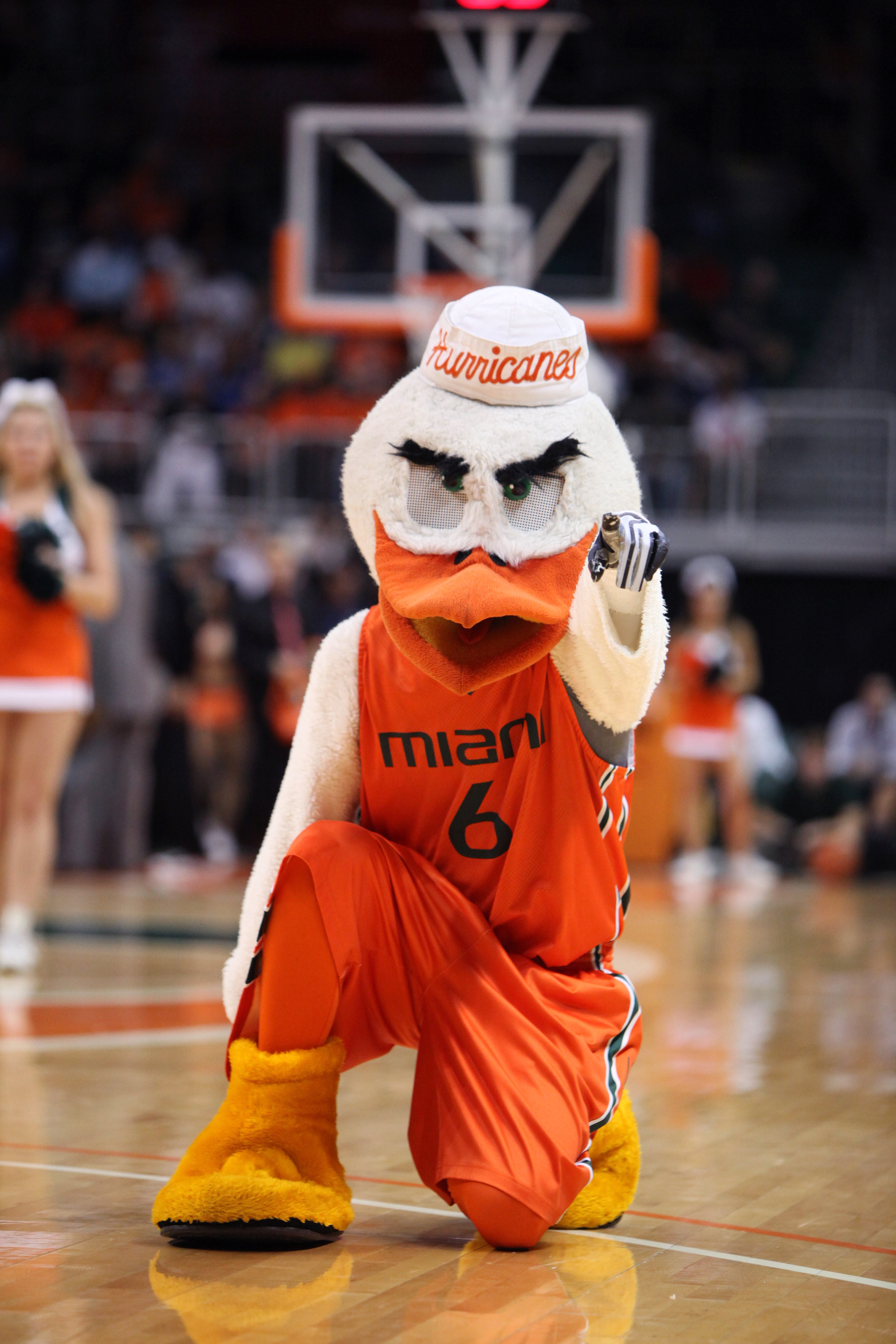
Sebastian the Ibis at Cameron Indoor Stadium for a Hurricanes men's basketball game against Duke in February 2011

The University of Miami's men's basketball team has reached the Sweet 16 of the NCAA Division I men's basketball tournament five times (1999–2000, 2012–2013, 2015–2016, 2021–2022, and 2022–2023), the Elite Eight twice (2021–2022 and 2022–2023), and the Final Four once (2022–2023). Several Miami Hurricanes men's basketball players have gone on to play in the NBA.

In 2022–23, the University of Miami's women's basketball team reached the NCAA Elite Eight of the NCAA Division I women's basketball tournament for the first time in program history. Several of its players have gone on to play in the WNBA.

Both basketball teams play their home games at Watsco Center, an 8,000-capacity indoor stadium on the University of Miami campus.

=== Men's and women's tennis ===
Players from the University of Miami's tennis program have gone on to amateur and professional accomplishments, including Israel team player Maya Tahan, Wimbledon Singles champion Rod Mandelstam, Pan American Games Doubles gold medal winner Ronni Reis, NCAA Women's Singles champion Audra Cohen, Wimbledon Doubles champion Doris Hart, three-time NCAA Singles champion Pancho Segura, and former professional tennis players Monique Albuquerque, Julia Cohen, Gardnar Mulloy, Ed Rubinoff, Michael Russell, Jodi Appelbaum-Steinbauer, and Todd Widom.

=== Other sports ===
The University of Miami women's soccer team and both its men's and women's track and field teams host their home meets in Cobb Stadium, which opened in 1999 on San Amaro Drive on the University of Miami campus.

== People ==
=== Notable alumni ===
Notable UMiami Alumni include:

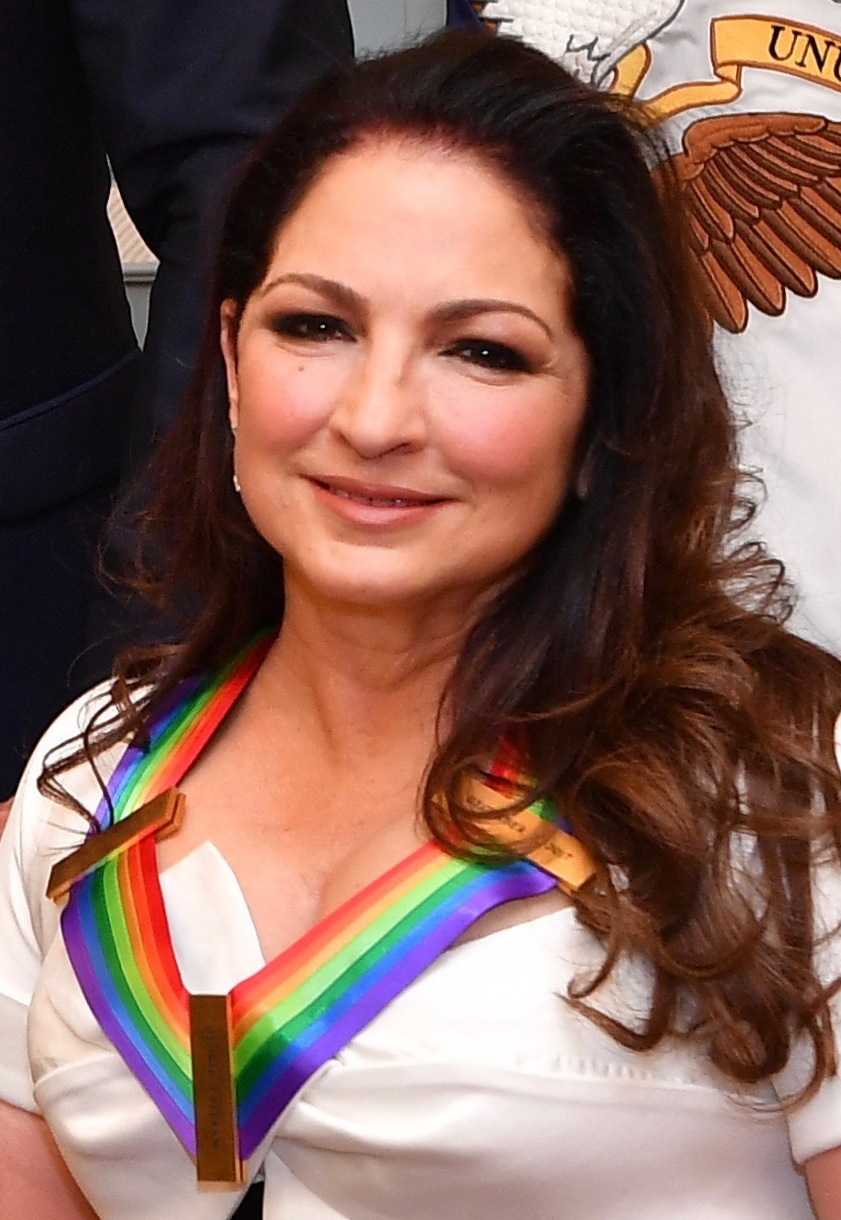
Gloria Estefan (BA, 1979)

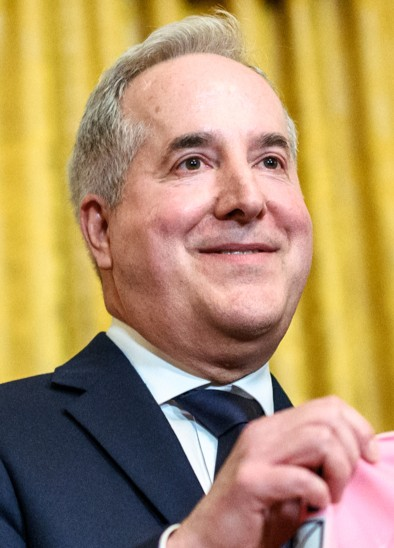
Jorge Mas (BBA, 1984; MBA, 1985)

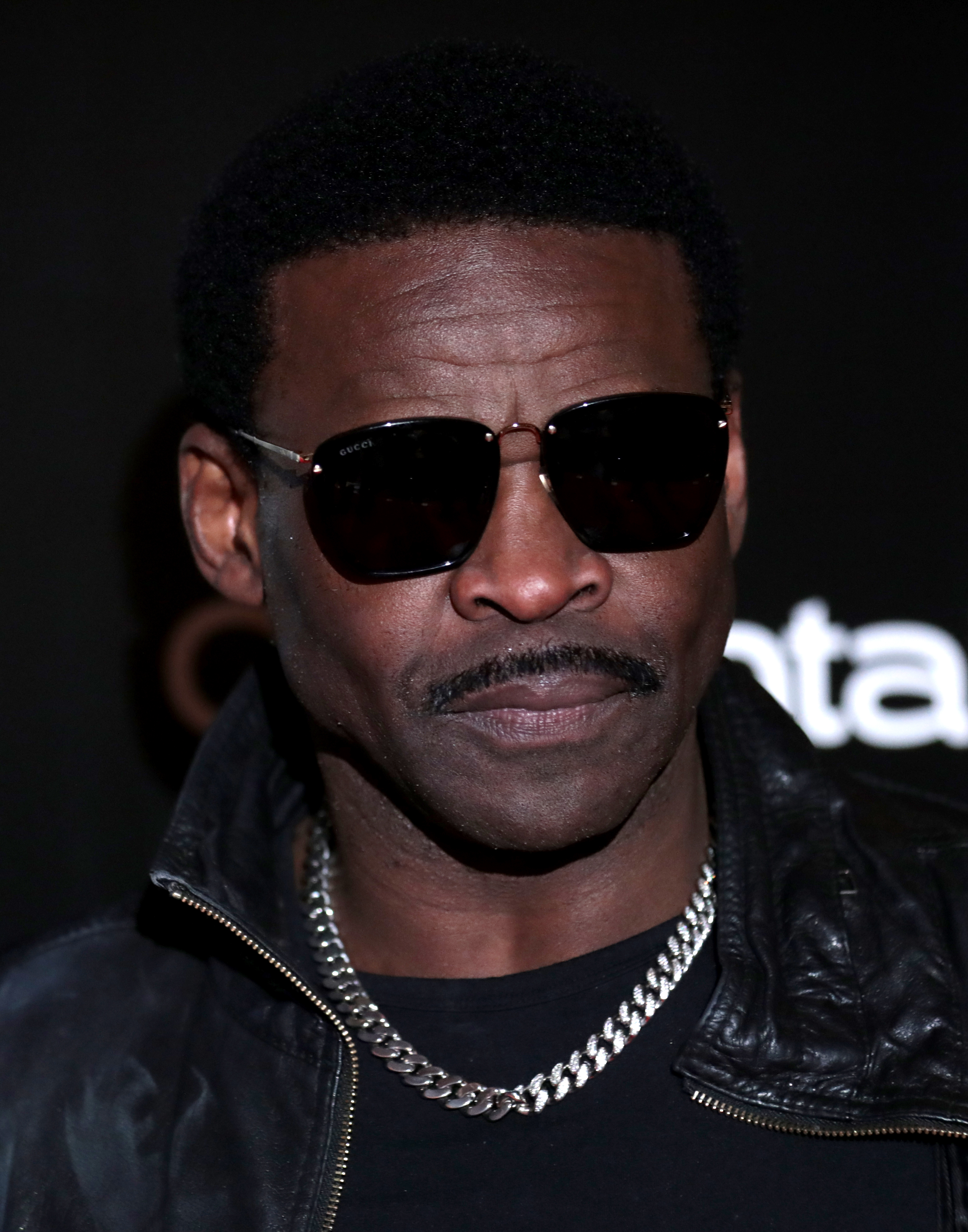
Michael Irvin (Attended 1984-1987)

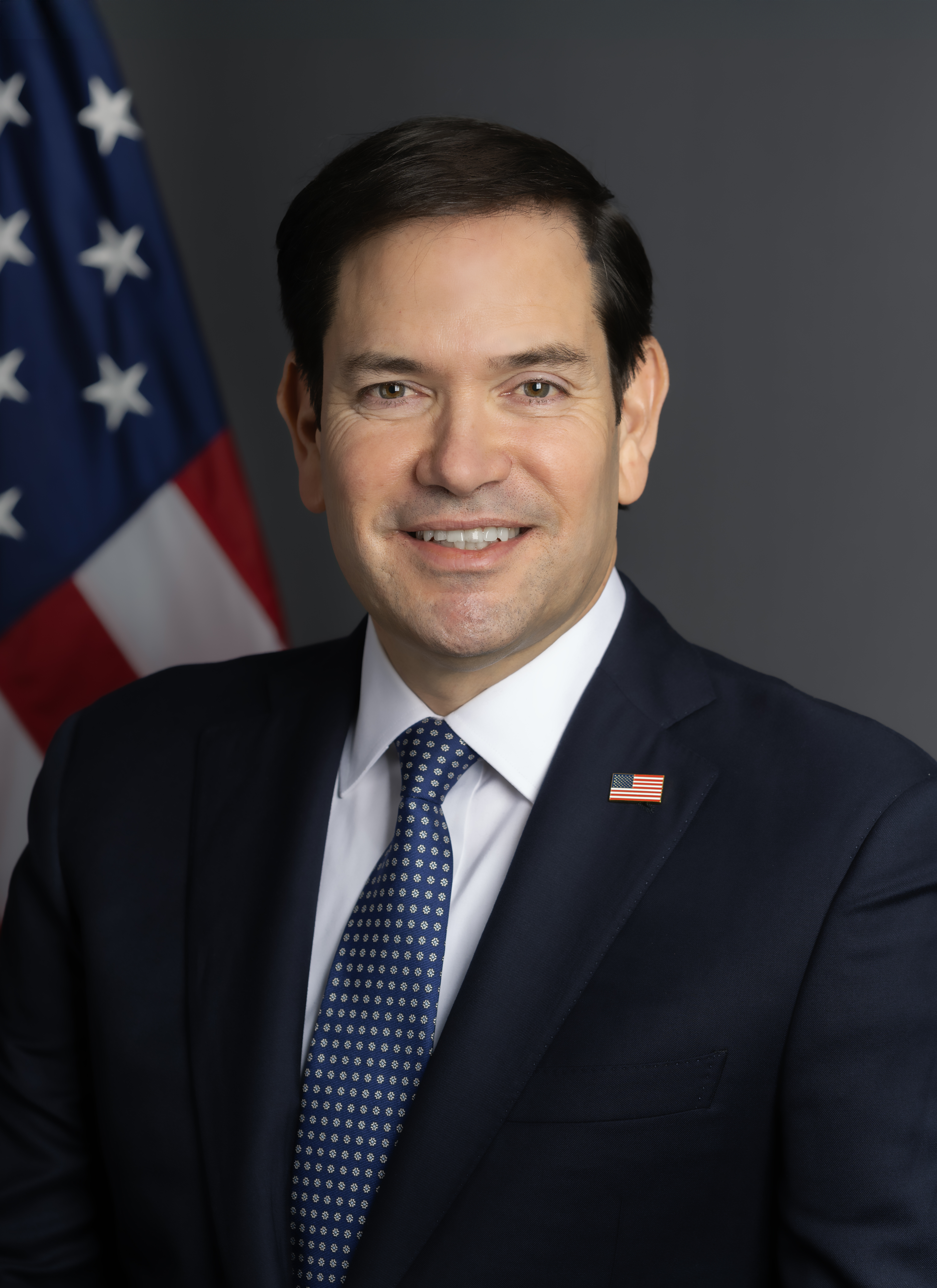
Marco Rubio (JD, 1996)

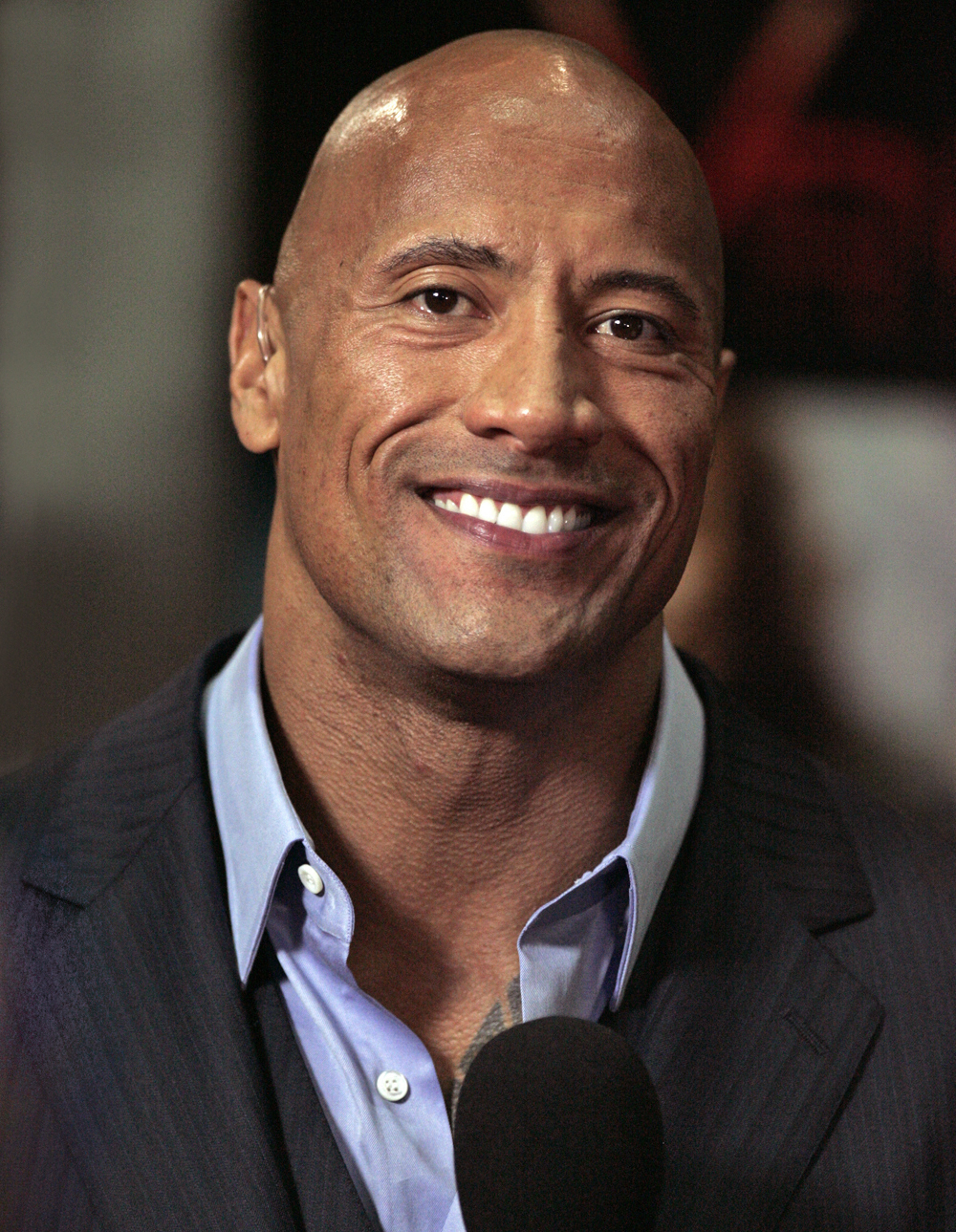
Dwayne "The Rock" Johnson (BGS, 1995)

Since its 1925 founding, several University of Miami alumni have gone on to globally-recognized accomplishment and influence in their respective fields. Among them are former Honduran president Porfirio Lobo Sosa, former Peruvian president Fernando Belaúnde, former Belize prime minister Dean Barrow, former Iceland prime minister Bjarni Benediktsson, economist and former Bahamas Central Bank governor Wendy Craigg, former Peruvian vice president and minister Mercedes Aráoz, Pulitzer Prize-winning poet and writing professor Donald Justice, actor Dwayne "The Rock" Johnson, Grammy Award-winning musicians Gloria Estefan, Bruce Hornsby, Enrique Iglesias, Jaco Pastorius, and Jon Secada, chief executive officers of various companies, public officials, heads of governmental agencies, scientists, academics, media personalities, authors and writers, and multiple professional athletes in Major League Baseball, the NBA, and the NFL, including eleven NFL Pro Football Hall of Fame inductees.

=== Notable faculty ===
University of Miami faculty include or have included a number of notable academics, including four Nobel Prize recipients and globally-recognized experts across nearly every academic discipline. Among them are physicist Paul Dirac, biochemists Robert F. Furchgott and Earl Wilbur Sutherland Jr., writers Paul Holdengräber and Juan Ramón Jiménez, former U.S. ambassador to the United Nations Peter Burleigh, sinologist Edward L. Dreyer, international affairs expert Leon Gouré, historians Mary Lindemann, Hermann Beck and Joan R. Piggott, economist Neil Wallace, finance and business management expert Henrik Cronqvist, former U.S. Secretary of Health and Services Donna Shalala, healthcare policy and management expert John Quelch, audio engineer Bill Porter, artist and architect Bonnie Seeman, architect Elizabeth Plater-Zyberk, sociologist Lowell Juilliard Carr, constitutional law expert John Hart Ely, administrative law expert Paul R. Verkuil, musicians Jaco Pastorius and Pat Metheny, artist Walter Darby Bannard, and philosopher Colin McGinn.
