= Hilario Candela =

Cuban-born architect (1934–2022)

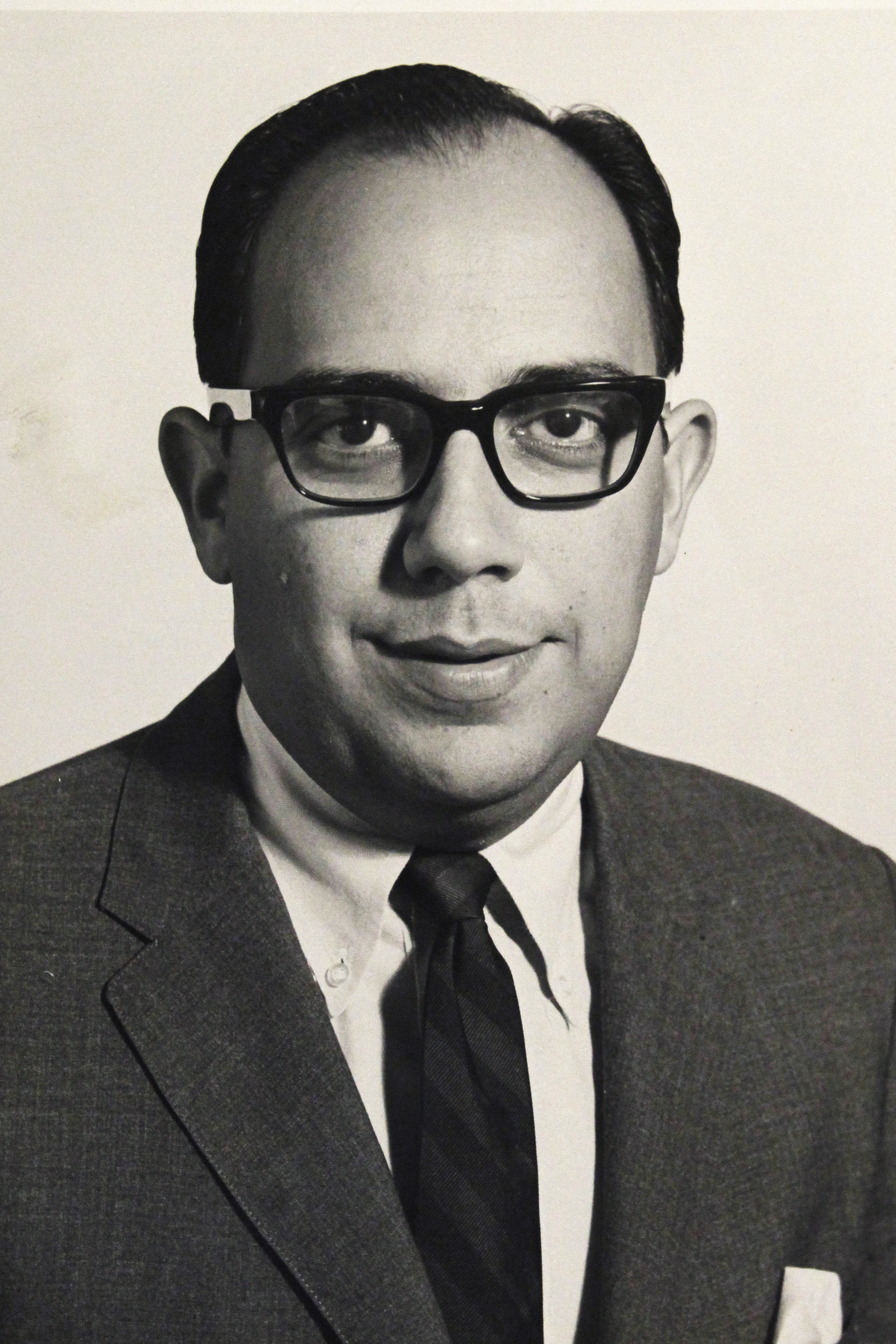
- Candela in c. 1968
- Born: June 4, 1934; Havana, Cuba
- Died: January 18, 2022 (aged 87); Coral Gables, Florida, U.S.
- Education: Georgia Tech
- Occupation: Architect
- Spouse: Eva Hernandez (m. 1963)
- Children: 4
- Practice: Spillis Candela & Partners Inc
- Buildings: Miami Marine Stadium

Hilario Candela (June 4, 1934 – January 18, 2022) was a Cuban-born American architect best known for his design of the Miami Marine Stadium on Virginia Key, Florida.

== Career ==
After studying architecture at Georgia Institute of Technology, Hilario Candela returned to his home country where he briefly worked at the Cuban firm SACMAG (Saenz-Cancio-Martin-Alvarez-Gutierrez, architects) between 1958 and 1959. During this period, the firm was working with Spanish-born architect Félix Candela, a distant relative of Hilario, on the Bacardí warehouse in Mexico. This experience – coupled with previous summer internships in the office of Max Borges Jr., the architect of the famed Tropicana Club in Havana – ultimately influenced his approach to designing the Marine Stadium for which he is best known. After escaping Cuba in 1960, Candela planted roots in Miami, Florida where he soon acquired a job as an architect at Pancoast, Ferendino, Skeels and Burnham in 1961. It was at this firm that he, alongside Albert Ferendino, was tasked with designing a seven-thousand-seat grandstand for speedboat racing on Virginia Key.

Candela remained at this firm until his retirement in 2006, although by then it had become known as Spillis, Candela DMJM.

Named a fellow of The American Institute of Architecture, Candela's work has garnered awards and distinctions. His most notable works include the first two campuses of Miami Dade College (North and South), the University of Miami Mailman Center, the James L. Knight Center and adjoining Hyatt Regency Hotel, and the NOAA's Atlantic Oceanographic Meteorological Laboratory. His last major project before retirement was Epiphany Catholic Church in South Miami, which was consecrated in 2002.

== Miami Marine Stadium ==
Candela designed his most well-known structure, the Miami Marine Stadium, at the age of 28. Then known as the Commodore Ralph Middleton Monroe Marine Stadium, the building served as a stadium for speedboat racing, a concert venue, and, on occasion, a venue for Easter services. The building had fallen into disrepair by the early 90s. Following the devastation of Hurricane Andrew in 1992, the structure was condemned and closed to the public, though FEMA reports later showed it had not sustained any significant damage from the storm. It has since remained mostly abandoned, becoming a haven for Graffiti writers and skateboarders.

Candela later led efforts to preserve the building alongside the "Friends of the Marine Stadium," which he co-founded in 2008. Through their efforts, the stadium became designated as an historic site by the City of Miami Historic and Environmental Preservation Board in October 2008. It has also been named one of America's 11 Most Endangered Historic Places by the National Trust for Historic Preservation.

== Personal life ==
Candela was born on June 4, 1934, in Havana, Cuba, to Hilario R. Candela and Carmen Roig Candela. After studying architecture at Georgia Tech, he returned to Havana in 1958 but quickly fled to the United States in 1960 following the Cuban Revolution and Fidel Castro's rise to power. Two years later, Hilario met Eva Hernandez at a New Year's Eve party at the top of the Everglades Hotel. The two began to date shortly thereafter and were married in August 1963. Together, the couple had four children (Cecilia, Maurice, Mark, and Hilary) who provided them with fifteen grandchildren.

Candela died from complications of COVID-19 in January 2022, at the age of 87.

== Buildings ==
- Epiphany Catholic Church in South Miami
