= Miami Hoshuko =

Weekend school in Miami-Dade County, Florida

- マイアミ補習校

Location
- 8755 SW 16th Street, Miami, FL 33165; 25.7550°N 80.3371°W

Information
- Type: Supplementary weekend Japanese school
- Established: 1983
- Website: www.miami-hoshuko.org

Miami Hoshuko (マイアミ補習校, Maiami Hoshūkō) is a supplementary Japanese school in Miami-Dade County, Florida. It holds classes in the First Baptist Church of Coral Park (Spanish: Iglesia Bautista de Coral Park) in Westchester, and it has its office in Doral.

As of 1997 the school is governed by a board of directors made of four parents. In 1997 Cristina M. Ortega of the Miami Herald described the school as "part school, part social club", citing how parents were on the classroom premises while their children were instructed.

== History ==
By January 1983, the Japanese community in the Miami area, including Broward County, sought to establish a weekend Japanese school. The expected number of children from Broward County was 20-25. The Florida Committee for the Establishment of a Japanese Language School formed to hammer out how to create a hoshuko. The initial plan was to create such a school in Broward County. Pine Crest School in Fort Lauderdale was a proposed location. In February 1983 the plan was instead to open the school at David Fairchild Elementary School, which is in an unincorporated area of the county.

Originally established in April 1983, Showa 58, it was called the Florida Nihongo Gakko, with the official name Florida Japanese Language School (フロリダ日本語補習校 Furorida Nihongo Hoshūkō). Its initial enrollment was 40.

In 1986, it was renamed Miami Hoshu Jugyo Ko (マイアミ補習授業校), then received its current name in 1990 (Heisei 2). By 1993 (Heisei 5), it was holding classes in a rented facility, in the Kendall United Methodist Church, now in Pinecrest but formerly in the Kendall census-designated place as of 1990.

In 1993, the Florida Nihongo Gakko had a campus in Coral Gables, with 23 students. In 1996, it was at the University of Miami's Rosenstiel School of Marine, Atmospheric, and Earth Science on Virginia Key in Miami. The University of Miami was willing to allow the hoshuko to hold classes there as the building did not have weekend activity. When at Rosenstiel, the hoshuko used ten classrooms, a library, and a cafeteria facility. By 1997 the school established branch classes in Boca Raton.

By 2002, its classes moved to their current location in Westchester.

In 2005, the hoshuko had students from Boca Raton and Weston.

== See also ==
- Japanese language education in the United States
