= Nikki Traylor-Knowles =

Marine biologist

- Education: Johns Hopkins University; Boston University
- Known for: Evolution of immunity, wound healing, and regeneration
- Awards: Fulbright scholar, 2022-2023; Kavli Frontiers in Science; Fellow of the National Academy of Sciences, 2016
- Scientific career
- Fields: Marine Biology and Ecology
- Workplaces: Stanford; University of Miami

Nikki Traylor-Knowles is a marine biologist and associate professor at the University of Miami. Her work includes research on stem cell therapy for coral and the effects of climate change on coral's immune response. She has also led research on keeping cnidarian cells alive in lab culture, an advancement that will further work on how cell types interact, function, and respond to stressors.

== Career ==
Traylor-Knowles received her bachelor's and master's degrees from Johns Hopkins University and her doctorate from Boston University. Following post-doctoral research at the Stanford University Hopkins Marine Station, she joined the faculty of the University of Miami Rosenstiel School of Marine, Atmospheric, and Earth Sciences. She also founded BWEEMS (Black Women in Ecology, Evolution, and Marine Sciences), a global nonprofit organization focused on fostering the involvement and influence of Black women in STEM.
