= Center for Southeastern Tropical Advanced Remote Sensing =

Coordinates: 25.6137°N 80.3842°W

The logo of the Center for Southeastern Tropical Advanced Remote Sensing (CSTARS)

The Center for Southeastern Tropical Advanced Remote Sensing (CSTARS) is a ground station owned by the University of Miami's Rosenstiel School of Marine, Atmospheric, and Earth Science that receives imagery data from a variety of remote sensing satellites.

CSTARS is located on the University of Miami's Richmond campus on Virginia Key in Miami, Florida.

== Overview ==
The center's mission is to collect satellite imagery for environmental monitoring of hurricanes, volcanoes, landslides, and other natural or man made disasters.

In 2000, the University of Miami purchased the United States Naval Observatory Secondary National Time Standard Facility. The purchase included 78 acres (320,000 m^{2}) of land with several buildings and a 20-meter antenna once used for Very Long Baseline Interferometry. This large antenna is currently used to support scientific communications with the Antarctic (on behalf of the National Science Foundation). Two 11 meter X-band antennas were added to create a high bandwidth data reception capability for the downlink of satellite image data. Scientists and staff perform research and analysis activities on-site as well.

The station mask covers a very large area stretching from Hudson Bay in northeastern Canada down to northern South America in the south. The mask includes Central America, the eastern Pacific Ocean, the Caribbean Basin, the Gulf of Mexico and much of the Eastern US including Eastern Seaboard. CSTARS provides a VoIP communication system for the Amundsen–Scott South Pole Station.

Admiral John Stavridis, former commanding officer of United States Southern Command, wrote the following about CSTARS in his book Partnership for the Americas

Another success story can be found in an academia innovation partnership formed with the University of Miami's Center for Southeastern Tropical Advanced Remote Sensing (CSTARS). The concept of using CSTARS was to determine how well access to a constellation of unclassified commercial satellites could support traditional Southern Command missions. Initial demonstrations were conducted with promising results. Subsequent letters of endorsements and demand signals for future use of CSTARS were published and promulgated to various centers of excellence and a funding mechanism was established within Southern Command. Within a year of the initial CSTARS demonstrations, hurricanes ravaged Haiti in 2008 and Southern Command responded with assistance, including an impromptu emergency redeployment of USS Kearsarge from its previously scheduled mission. Assessment of inland damage caused by the hurricanes was a critical need to the humanitarian assistance and disaster relief (HA/DR) efforts, and CSTARS provided vital imagery to those operations to quickly determine areas of highest damage and evaluation of inland infrastructure. Unclassified CSTARS imagery and information were then rapidly broadcast and distributed to both DOD and interagency responders via unclassified email. This response was only possible due to the groundwork laid during the initial CSTARS demonstration and a long-term vision for follow-on support made possible by CSTARS to Southern Command.

== Projects ==
=== Hurricane Katrina Damage Assessment and Disaster Relief ===
CSTARS played a vital role in the damage assessment and relief efforts of New Orleans and the Gulf Coast in the aftermath of Hurricane Katrina. The first remote sensing images illustrating the extent of the flooding in New Orleans were collected at CSTARS.

=== Project with Department of Homeland Security (DHS) ===
The United States Department of Homeland Security has included CSTARS as one of its "Centers of Excellence" so that CSTARS will work with the Stevens Institute of Technology to research port security and maritime monitoring issues.

=== Project with Office of Naval Research (ONR) ===
The Office of Naval Research awarded CSTARS a grant to support satellite based research studies on internal waves and typhoons in the western Pacific Ocean.

=== Palau ===
CSTARS participated in a Pew Charitable Trusts study to examine how to protect one of the largest Marine Protected (MPA) areas in the world through the utilization of commercially available earth imaging satellites.
