= Zuidema =

Zuidema is a West Frisian toponymic surname. Notable people with the surname include:

- Coen Zuidema (born 1942), Dutch chess player
- Johan Zuidema (born 1948), Dutch footballer
- Paquita Zuidema, Dutch atmospheric scientist
- R. Tom Zuidema (1927–2016), Dutch anthropologist
- Sytse Ulbe Zuidema (1906–1975), Dutch philosopher

== See also ==
- Zuidema-Idsardi House, historic home in Erie County, New York, built for Dutch businessman John H. Zuidema
