= Carin Ashjian =

American biological oceanographer

Carin Jessica Ashjian
- Born: April 13, 1960 (age 66); Boston, Massachusetts, U.S.
- Education: University of Rhode Island; Cornell University
- Scientific career
- Workplaces: Woods Hole Oceanographic Institution; Rosenstiel School of Marine, Atmospheric, and Earth Science; Brookhaven National Laboratory
- Thesis: The influence of the Gulf Stream on the regional biogeography of zooplankton (Copepods) (1991)

Carin Jessica Ashjian (born April 13, 1960) is an American biological oceanographer who is an associate scientist at the Woods Hole Oceanographic Institution. She studies how the physical environment influences the distribution of plankton in the Beaufort Sea.

== Early life and education ==
Ashijan was born in Boston, and grew up in Massachusetts. She spent her summer holidays on Buzzards Bay. She was an undergraduate student in biology at Cornell University, and started working as an assistant researcher in Woods Hole Oceanographic Institution in 1984. Ashijan completed her doctoral studies at the University of Rhode Island, where she investigated the impact of Gulf Stream on the biogeography of zooplankton.

Ashjian joined the Brookhaven National Laboratory as a research associate. She spent two years at Brookhaven before moving to the University of Miami's Rosenstiel School of Marine, Atmospheric, and Earth Science. She completed two cruises to the Arctic, which inspired her research in polar regions. Six months later, Ashjian returned to Woods Hole Oceanographic Institution.

== Research and career ==
Ashijan started her independent academic career at Woods Hole Oceanographic Institution, working at the Surface Heat Budget of the Arctic Ocean (SHEBA) ice camp based in the Beaufort Sea. The SHEBA mission involved freezing a ship into the ice of the Beaufort Sea, monitoring the distributions of copepods and monitoring the reproduction, growth and development of the crustaceans.

In the Southern Ocean, Ashjian studied the horizontal and vertical distributions of zooplankton. Zooplankton such as krill are critical in providing food for the trophic community of the Antarctic. The GLOBEC project collects samples of zooplankton using a Multiple Opening Closing Net and Environmental Sensing System (MOCNESS), and uses a Video Plankton Recorder to monitor the distribution of krill under the ice.

In February 2020, Ashjian took part in an expedition on a German icebreaker to monitor zooplankton. She was on an ice floe during the start of the COVID-19 pandemic. She could not return to land until June, when replacement teams could complete quarantine.

== Selected publications ==
- Olson, Donald B.; Hitchcock, Gary L.; Mariano, Arthur J.; Ashjian, Carin J.; Peng, Ge; Nero, Redwood W.; Podestá, Guillermo P. (1994). "Life on the Edge: Marine Life and Fronts". Oceanography. 7 (2): 52–60. Bibcode:1994Ocgpy...7b..52O. doi:10.5670/oceanog.1994.03. ISSN 1042-8275. JSTOR 43924679.
- Ashjian, Carin J; Campbell, Robert G; Welch, Harold E; Butler, Mari; Van Keuren, Donna (October 2003). "Annual cycle in abundance, distribution, and size in relation to hydrography of important copepod species in the western Arctic Ocean". Deep Sea Research Part I: Oceanographic Research Papers. 50 (10–11): 1235–1261. Bibcode:2003DSRI...50.1235A. doi:10.1016/s0967-0637(03)00129-8. ISSN 0967-0637.
- Campbell, Robert G.; Sherr, Evelyn B.; Ashjian, Carin J.; Plourde, Stéphane; Sherr, Barry F.; Hill, Victoria; Stockwell, Dean A. (August 2009). "Mesozooplankton prey preference and grazing impact in the western Arctic Ocean". Deep Sea Research Part II: Topical Studies in Oceanography. 56 (17): 1274–1289. Bibcode:2009DSRII..56.1274C. doi:10.1016/j.dsr2.2008.10.027. ISSN 0967-0645.
