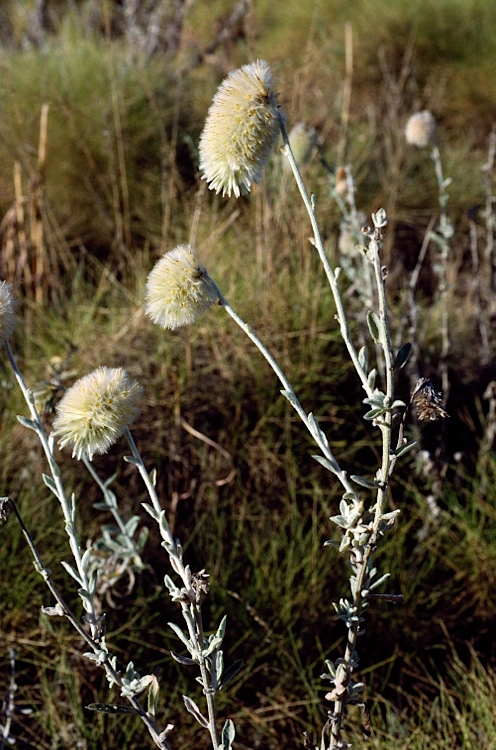
- In the Oscar Range

Scientific classification
- Kingdom: Plantae
- Clade: Tracheophytes
- Clade: Angiosperms
- Clade: Eudicots
- Order: Caryophyllales
- Family: Amaranthaceae
- Genus: Ptilotus
- Species: P. gardneri

Binomial name
- Ptilotus gardneri Benl

Synonyms
- Ptilotus gardneri Benl var. gardneri; Ptilotus gardneri var. inermis Benl

= Ptilotus gardneri =

Species of grass-like plant

Ptilotus gardneri is a species of flowering plant in the family Amaranthaceae and is endemic to north-western Australia. It is an erect perennial herb, with linear leaves and oval or cylindrical green spikes of densely arranged flowers.

== Description ==
Ptilotus gardneri is an erect, perennial herb that typically grows to a height of up to 75 cm (30 in). Its stem leaves are oblong to lance-shaped, mostly 20–50 mm (0.79–1.97 in) long and 7–10 mm (0.28–0.39 in) wide. The flowers are usually arranged in solitary, oval or cylindrical spikes up to 85 mm (3.3 in) long and 43 mm (1.7 in) wide on a long, with hairy, coloured bracts mostly 9.5–10.5 mm (0.37–0.41 in) long and bracteoles 7–8 mm (0.28–0.31 in) long with a prominent midrib. The outer tepals are 19.5–20.0 mm (0.77–0.79 in) long and the inner tepals 18–19 mm (0.71–0.75 in) long. The style is 14.5–15.0 mm (0.57–0.59 in) long and s-shaped, fixed to the centre of the ovary. Flowering occurs from April to July and the seeds are dull orange or brown and 1.9–2.0 mm (0.075–0.079 in) long.

== Taxonomy ==
Ptilotus gardneri was first formally described in 1976 by Gerhard Benl in the journal Nuytsia. The specific epithet (gardneri) honours Charles A. Gardner, "who not only collected many Ptilotus specimens, but also recognized several taxa as new".

== Distribution and habitat ==
Ptilotus gardneri grows on limestone on outcrops and plateaus in the Central Kimberley, Dampierland and Ord Victoria Plain bioregions of Western Australia and the Dampierland, Ord Victoria Plain and Tanami bioregions of the Northern Territory.

== Conservation status ==
This species of Ptilotus is listed as "not threatened" by the Government of Western Australia Department of Biodiversity, Conservation and Attractions, and as "data deficient" under the Territory Parks and Wildlife Conservation Act.

== See also ==
- List of Ptilotus species
