= Lawson Thomas =

American lawyer

Lawson E. Thomas
- Born: January 28, 1898; Ocala, Florida
- Died: September 14, 1989 (age 91)
- Education: Florida A&M (BS); University of Michigan Law School (LL.B)

Lawson E. Thomas was an American lawyer and civil rights activist who served as the first African-American judge appointed in the American South since Reconstruction. As a lawyer, he maintained his own legal practice which was unusual for a black attorney in Florida at the time. Lawson Thomas took on and won many civil rights cases in Florida and was a key figure in wade-ins that led to the establishment of Virginia Key as the first black beach in Miami Dade County.

== Early life and education ==
Lawson Edward Thomas was born in Ocala, Florida on January 28, 1898, the first of seven sons born to parents whose families had both moved from South Carolina. His mother's family had established Butlerville, a farming community near Ocala. His father, Robert Jr. and grandfather, Robert Sr. were both mechanics, and Robert Jr. built phosphate mines across northern Florida. Lawson Thomas completed his education in public schools in Ocala before attending what is now Florida A&M University, but which was then referred to as the "Florida Agricultural and Mechanical College for Negroes," which he graduated from in 1919. Lawson Thomas's education up to this point was segregated due to Florida's 1885 Constitution ban on integrated schools. Because it was not possible for Thomas to attend a white law school in Florida, and there were no Black law schools in Florida, Thomas was forced to attend law school out of the state. In 1923, Thomas earned a law degree from the University of Michigan Law School, and in 1926 he was admitted to the Michigan Bar. As an attorney, Lawson Thomas practiced law in Detroit for two years after having passed the bar until moving back to Florida in 1928.

== Legal practice and civil rights protests ==
=== First black lawyer to present a case in Miami ===
After returning to Florida, Lawson Thomas worked with the law offices of McGill and McGill in Jacksonville until 1934 before beginning to practice law in Miami in 1935. At the time black attorneys in Florida were typically limited to work for which they did not need to appear in a court room. On Thanksgiving of 1937, Thomas appeared in Miami's municipal court to present a case instead of hiring a white attorney to present the case for him. Although the bailiff at first refused to allow Thomas to sit in the front of the courtroom, going so far as to threaten to throw him out the courthouse window, Thomas became the first Black lawyer to present a case in person in Miami. Lawson Thomas would serve as a prominent civil rights attorney, at times cooperating with the NAACP until his appointment as a judge in 1950.

=== Haulover Beach wade in and creation of Virginia Key as a black beach ===
Prior to the mid 1940's, African Americans were barred from all public beaches in Dade County(now Miami-Dade County), and needed to travel north to beaches out of the county, or use ponds and other bodies of water as replacements for the beach. World War II lead to an increased push for racial equality by African Americans, as the double Double V campaign sought victory against both the Axis and segregation. In Miami, the war had a particularly strong effect on the civil rights movement, as the city saw a dramatic population increase brought about by both the expansion of wartime industries and the presence of soldiers from across the United States being trained in Miami. This sudden change inflamed racial tensions across Florida and the Army Services Forces in Florida anticipated race riots. The racial environment in Miami at the end of the war encouraged civil rights activists in Miami to push further than they had prior. Lawson Thomas and other members of the Negro Service Council, a civil rights organization that would become the Urban League of Greater Miami, planned a protest to desegregate Haulover Beach. Another group, the Negro Interdenominational Alliance was supposed to participate in the protest as well, but no members showed up. Five members of the Negro Service Council were joined by two sailors in the US Navy who had been stationed on Miami Beach. Although the organization itself played no role in organizing the protest, most of the protestors where members of the NAACP. The protesters waded in the surf waiting to be arrested while Thomas stayed on the beach with five hundred dollars in order to pay bail. The president of the Negro Citizens Service League, named Judge Henderson, called the police from the headquarters of the Longshoremen's Association, telling them that "there are some Negroes swimming at Haulover Beach." By making the call from the headquarters of the Longshoremen's Association, which was a prominent labor union, the protestors made the implicit threat of bringing more people to the demonstration. Thomas had planned for the protestors to be arrested so that he would be able to defend them in court and desegregate the beach, but the policemen at the scene refused to arrest the protestors, fearing that it could cause a controversy and inflame racial tensions. Thomas and the other protestors took this as a signal that they could go in the water, but the police disagreed and a back and forth began that was settled when County Commissioner Charles Crandon arrived and agreed to a meeting with Thomas the next day. As a result of this demonstration, Virginia Key became the first black beach in Dade County three months later on August 8, 1945. Virginia Key would remain the only black beach in the county until another protest led to the desegregation of Crandon park, named after Commissioner Crandon, in 1959. During this time Virginia Key became a popular destination for black beachgoers from Miami as well as black tourists. The protest was relatively unique because it occurred while World War II was still ongoing, as Japan would not surrender until August 15th, 1945, so the protest pre-dated almost all of the civil rights movement.

=== Clarence C. Walker Civic League et al. v. Broward County Board of Public Instruction ===
Black schools in Broward County were partially closed during winter months, ostensibly to help with agriculture, while white schools remained open. Thomas represented the Clarence C. Walker Civic League in a suit against the county board of public instruction on the basis that black students were being denied an equal education. The case predated Brown v. Board of Education, so the separate but equal doctrine established by Plessy v. Ferguson was still in effect. The court's ruling denied the injunction sought by Thomas on the grounds that the closing of black schools during winter had been a wartime measure and would be expected to end at the end of the war anyway.

=== Quincy v. State ===
Aaron Quincy was a black man who was indicted by an all white grand jury for the first degree murder of Lena Sparkman, a white woman in Holly Hill, Florida. Thomas appealed the case on the basis that black citizens had been excluded from the grand jury and that Quincy had only been indicted because of his race. As a result, the circuit court ordered for the previous indictment to be thrown out and for a new grand jury that did not exclude African Americans to be selected. Quincy would nevertheless go on to be indicted and convicted in 1948 following the new jury selection. After the Quincy case, African Americans began to be regularly selected for jury duty across much of Florida for the first time since reconstruction.

=== Other civil rights cases and legal experiences ===
Thomas filed the first lawsuits over racial equality in the pay of public school teachers in Marion and Lake Counties. He also submitted briefs amicus curia in a case that prevented the creation of race-based zoning in Dade County. Thomas additionally supervised the military registration of all black men in Miami between the ages of twenty one and thirty six prior to the United States' entry into World War II. Through his extensive legal experience, Thomas built connections with leading white legal figures in Florida, which would later contribute to his judicial appointment.

== Judgeship ==
On April 19, 1950, Thomas was unanimously appointed as judge by the Miami City Commission after being recommended for the Negro Municipal Court by Mayor Robert L. Floyd. This appointment made Thomas the first black judge to serve in the United States since reconstruction. The Negro Municipal Court was a new court which only had jurisdiction over crimes committed by black Miamians within black areas of the city, and could not try any case in which a white person was involved. Although somewhat similar courts had existed prior in Native American communities, it is considered the only case of a racially segregated justice system ever existing in the United States. The existence of the court proved controversial, as many figures in the Miami African American community lauded it for expanding the self governance of African Americans, while others criticized it for continuing segregation. Judge Thomas remained as the judge for the court until 1961, and the court itself continued to exist until the desegregation of the Miami city government in 1963.

== Personal life ==
Lawson Thomas married his secretary, Eugenia Bell Brooks in 1953. The two remained married until his death of natural causes on September 14 of 1989.

== Honors ==
The Lawson E. Tomas Courthouse Center, a county courthouse in Downtown Miami, bears Judge Thomas's name. Additionally his former law offices in Overtown is designated as a historic site.
