= Amy C. Clement =

American climatologist

Amy Clement
- Born: Boston, Massachusetts, U.S.
- Education: Columbia College (BA); Columbia University (Ph.D.)
- Awards: Fellow, American Meteorological Society, Fellow, American Geophysical Union, Lawrence Leroy Meisinger Award, James B. Macelwane Medal
- Scientific career
- Fields: atmospheric and marine science
- Workplaces: University of Miami's Rosenstiel School of Marine, Atmospheric, and Earth Science
- Website: amyclement.weebly.com

Amy C. Clement is an atmospheric and marine scientist studying and modeling global climate change at the University of Miami's Rosenstiel School of Marine, Atmospheric, and Earth Science.

Her research focuses on cloud albedo feedbacks, ocean circulation patterns, and the El Niño Southern Oscillation (ENSO).

== Early life and education ==
Clement was born in Boston and moved to Long Island shortly thereafter, where she spent most of her adolescent life.

Clement attended Columbia College where she received a B.A. in physics. She received her Ph.D from the Earth and Environmental Science program at Columbia University. Her studies continued at the University of Pierre and Marie Currie in Paris, where she conducted her postdoctoral work.

== Career ==
Clement is a climate scientist studying atmospheric and oceanic interactions related to climate change. She studies the physics of climate modeling, and seeks to understand the mechanisms of climate change to refine a global climate model. Clement is currently a professor at University of Miami's Rosenstiel School of Marine, Atmospheric, and Earth Science. She is involved in a long-term project focused on understanding the importance of tropical regions in paleoclimate for her global climate model. One of Clements primary research topics focuses on the role of the cloud albedo feedback in a warming climate. Her studies examine low-altitude clouds, which are capable of reflecting incoming solar radiation back into space. She studies the relationship between the cover of these clouds and the rate of warming to examine the role of clouds. Clements' findings support this theory in that as climate and oceans warm, low laying clouds form less frequently, which lowers the albedo of the earth with more infrared radiation is absorbed rather than reflected, leading to a warmer climate with less clouds. As most in of her research, these findings support a positive feedback warming cycle in climate. Additionally, Clement has conducted significant research on the El Niño Southern Oscillation (ENSO), which is known to play a large role in the climate system. Clement and her researchers somewhat controversially suggest that atmospheric and ocean dynamics need not be connected in order to understand tropical climate and their associated global patterns.

She was awarded the James B Macelwane Medal in 2007. The Macelwane Medal is presented to young scientists who has made significant contributions in the realm of geophysical sciences. Clement was nominated for this award because of her research in tropical atmospheric and ocean dynamics. In conducting this research, she focused on how the atmosphere and ocean interact with both orbital changes and the thermohaline circulation system.

=== Significant publications ===
- Orbital controls on the El Nino/Southern Oscillation and the tropical climate, Paleoceanography, 1999
- The Atlantic Multidecadal Oscillation without a role for ocean circulation, Science, 2015
- An Ocean Dynamical Thermostat, Journal of Climate, 1996
- Observational and Model Evidence for Positive Low-Level Cloud Feedback, Science 2009

== Awards and honors ==
Clement has earned several awards throughout her career for her intellectual leadership and mentoring success.

- Fellow of the American Meteorological Society
- Fellow to the American Geophysical Union
- AMS Clarence Leroy Meisinger Award
- AGU James B. Macelwane Medal in 2007
- Rosenstiel School of Marine, Atmospheric, and Earth Science's "Outstanding Faculty Mentor Award" (2015), because of her dedication to encouraging students to think more critically and creatively about fundamental climate processes.

== Other interests ==
Clement practices surfing in Miami, Florida. Additionally, Clement is part of a public research group involving students from University of Miami. Clement is now married and has two children.
