= Miami Marine Stadium =

Stadium in Miami, Florida

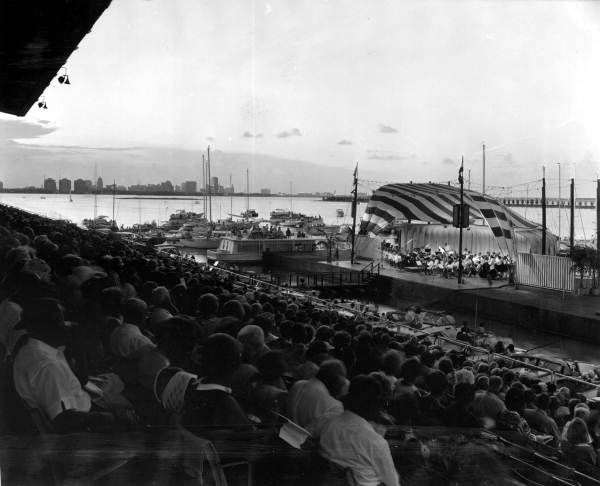
- Concert-goers watch an evening concert on Biscayne Bay, 1967
- Interactive map of Miami Marine Stadium
- Former names: Ralph Munroe Marine Stadium
- Location: Virginia Key, Miami, Florida, United States
- Coordinates: 25°44′35″N 80°10′11″W
- Owner: City of Miami
- Capacity: 6,566
- Surface: Marine
- Acreage: 240 acres (970,000 m^{2}) (land and water)

Construction
- Opened: December 27, 1963
- Closed: September 18, 1992
- Reopened: October 5, 2024
- Cost: $2 million (1963)
- Architect: Hilario Candela
- General contractor: Millman Construction

The Miami Marine Stadium is a marine stadium on Virginia Key, Miami, Florida, United States. The facility, completed in 1963 on land donated to the City of Miami from the Matheson family, is the first stadium purpose-built for powerboat racing in the United States. The stadium was abandoned in 1992 when officials declared it unsafe following Hurricane Andrew. It was listed on the National Register of Historic Places in 2018.

== History ==
The 6,566-seat stadium was built in 1963 by the Millman Construction Company of Miami Beach. The structure was built on land donated for water sports, and designed by architect Hilario Candela, then a 28-year-old recent immigrant from Cuba. It was dedicated as the Ralph Munroe Marine Stadium and cost $2 million (equivalent to $21,033,000 in 2025). A speed boat racer, James Tapp, was killed on opening day. The venue, located just southeast of Downtown Miami, was revered for its scenic views of Downtown and Miami Beach, hosting motorboat events, music concerts including Jimmy Buffett,and events featuring the likes of Mitch Miller, Sammy Davis Jr., and U.S. President Richard Nixon (whose seasonal winter residence, dubbed "the Florida White House", was on nearby Key Biscayne).

In 1979, Miami Rowing Club relocated to an empty lot between the stadium and MAST Academy (then known as Planet Ocean museum). The Miami International Regatta has been hosted by Miami Rowing Club since 1973, the basin provides a 1,500 meter 7 lane course for practice, training and racing.

From its opening for nearly 30 years, the stadium was used for its intended water sports as well as concerts, sporting events such as boxing (which began in 1972), and even figured prominently in the 1967 Elvis Presley film Clambake, serving as the scene of Elvis' climactic speedboat race. In the wake of Hurricane Andrew, it was declared an unsafe building under Miami-Dade County building code on September 18, 1992. In 2004, $3 million was pledged in a municipal bonds by county residents for the restoration and renovation of the facilities.

=== Revitalization ===
In 2009, the National Trust for Historic Preservation named the Commodore Ralph Middleton Munroe Marine Stadium to its list of America's 11 Most Endangered Historic Places. The National Trust designated the stadium as a National Treasure in March 2012. On April 18, 2012, the Florida Chapter of the American Institute of Architects placed the stadium on its list of Florida Architecture: 100 Years. 100 Places as the Ralph Middleton Munroe Miami Marine Stadium.

A group, Friends of Miami Marine Stadium, was formed in 2008 with the purpose of restoring the Marine Stadium and returning it to operation. Performer Gloria Estefan, through her charity group, is a major contributor to Friends of Miami Marine Stadium. The City of Miami granted control of the stadium property to the group in 2013, and the group returned in late 2014 with a revitalization proposal and supposed funds. This project brought the Miami International Boat Show to the Miami Marine Stadium on February 11–15, 2016. The Miami International Boat Show used the Marine Stadium as a venue from 2016 until 2021.

In 2016, the Miami City Commission (city council) voted to approve up to $45 million in revenue-bond financing to restore the stadium. An architecture firm was hired and restoration plans were finalized, but the bond authorization expired. The city had planned to renovate the Miami Marine Stadium into a concert venue, but, by late 2020, Miami officials had refused to disclose detailed plans for the venue. By 2021, the city of Miami was looking to hire a new advisor to consult on the restoration of the Miami Marine Stadium. City commissioners were expected to vote on a $61.2 million revenue bond financing on February 24, 2022, but the vote was deferred until late May 2022. This delay was intended to allow Miami officials to conduct a cost–benefit analysis of the renovation. In June 2022, Miami officials further postponed a vote on the bond.

Meanwhile, Miami officials proposed in late 2022 to build a boat ramp, as well as parking space for boat trailers, next to the Miami Marine Stadium. Miami's Planning and Zoning Advisory Board approved the proposal in December 2022, in spite of concerns that the construction of the boat ramp would cause congestion on the Rickenbacker Causeway. Preservationist group Dade Heritage Trust asked city officials to cancel the approval of the boat ramp, but Miami city commissioners rejected the request in early 2023. Workers began restoring the Miami Marine Stadium in early 2023, repairing damaged pilings at a cost of $2.4 million.

== Design ==
Poured entirely in concrete, the Miami Marine Stadium consists of a cantilevered folded plate roof supported by eight large slanted columns anchored in the ground through the grandstand. A huge horizontal beam tied them all together. A cut in the seating arrangement allowed spectators to appreciate the full height of the posts, which were pushed as far back as possible to permit unobstructed views over the watercourse. This concept was presented by one of the project's architects, Hilaro Candela to be original, however the idea was synonymous to several other well-established stadiums throughout Latin America and Europe, including the Florence Stadium designed by Pier Luigi Nervi, built 1932, the Baseball and Soccer stadiums in Cartagena, Colombia, by Guillermo Gonzalez Zuleta in 1947 and The University Stadium in Caracas designed by Carlos Raul Villanueva, built in 1950. The Miami Marine Stadium bears striking resemblance to the horse-racing Hipódromo de la Zarzuela in Madrid, Spain, designed by Carlos Arniches Moltó and Martín Domínguez in 1934–35.

== Facilities ==
The Stadium was host for many world class powerboat events including Unlimited Hydroplane, Inboard, Outboard, Performance Craft, Stock, Modified, Grand National divisions as well as other special event races. The Stadium was also the site of a number of nationally televised events including the Orange Bowl Regatta (power boat races), the Bill Muncey Invitational and the ESPN All American Challenge Series. The last major race in the Stadium was the 20th Annual Budweiser Hydroplane Regatta, June 1–3, 1990.

Since its condemnation in 1992, the stadium has become a haven for graffiti artists, but remains an attraction for its photographic panoramic view of the central business districts and barrier islands of Miami.
