= Rana Fine =

American oceanographer and researcher

- Born: Rana Arnold; April 17, 1944; New York City, U.S.
- Education: New York University, University of Miami
- Spouses: Salle Fine (m. 1965, div. 1980); James Mattson (m. 1983)
- Scientific career
- Workplaces: University of Miami's Rosenstiel School of Marine, Atmospheric, and Earth Science
- Thesis: "High Pressure P-V-T Properties Of Seawater And Related Liquids" (1975)
- Doctoral advisor: Frank Millero

Rana Arnold Fine (born April 1944) is Professor Emeritus at the University of Miami's Rosenstiel School of Marine, Atmospheric, and Earth Science. Her research primarily addresses understanding ocean circulation processes over time through the use of chemical tracers and the connection to climate.

== Early life and education ==
Fine was born April 17, 1944, in New York City to Joseph and Etta (née Kreisman) Arnold. Fine credits her attendance at the Bronx High School of Science for starting her on a career path with science and mathematics.

Fine has a B.A. in mathematics from New York University and a M.A. in mathematics from the University of Miami. She completed her Ph.D. in physical oceanography from the University of Miami's Rosenstiel School of Marine, Atmospheric, and Earth Science in 1975. Her dissertation was High Pressure P-V-T Properties Of Seawater And Related Liquids with Frank Millero serving as her advisor and committee chair.

== Research career ==
Upon completing her Ph.D., Fine continued on with the University of Miami's Rosenstiel School in a one-year postdoctoral position in the Tritium Laboratory from 1976–1977. She remained was an assistant professor (1977–1980), research associate professor (1980–1984), and associate professor (1984–1990). In 1990, she was promoted to full professor and chair of the University of Miami's Department of Marine and Atmospheric Chemistry.

Fine's research uses measurements of chemicals in the oceans to improve our understanding of the transfer of gases from the atmosphere to the oceans. Tracers, such as chlorofluorocarbons and sulfur hexafluoride (SF_{6}), have been used to determine a range of oceanic properties, including ocean transport and rates of biogeochemical processes. Fine has secured grant funding to support her research from the National Science Foundation, Office of Naval Research, National Oceanic and Atmospheric Administration, and NASA.

She has served on scientific committees at the national level. She was a member of the National Science Foundation Division of Polar Programs Advisory Committee (1987-1990). For the National Academy of Sciences, she worked with the Geophysics Study Committee (1989-1992) and Ocean Studies Board, as well as chair of the OSB nominating committee. While Chair of the National Academy of Sciences' Committee On Major U.S. Oceanographic Research Programs, she was involved with the generation of the 1999 Global Ocean Science: Toward an Integrated Approach consensus study report from the National Academies Press. While serving on the NAS Committee on the Evolution of the National Oceanographic Research Fleet, she was part of the 2009 Science at Sea: Meeting Future Oceanographic Goals with a Robust Academic Research Fleet consensus study report, also from the National Academies Press. She has served on the scientific steering committee of the World Ocean Circulation Experiment (WOCE). Fine led the 2001 Committee of Visitors that advised the National Science Foundation on their programs.

Fine has been active in encouraging and mentoring women to enter the field of physical oceanography. In her biography for The Oceanography Society's Women in Oceanography: A Decade Later, she mentions how during her time at the National Science Foundation in the early 1980s, "I was one of only four women considered to be physical oceanographers at academic institutions in the United States." She credits programs such as Mentoring Physical Oceanography Women to Increase Retention (MPOWIR) for increasing the number of women in the geosciences and ocean sciences. In 2008, the American Geophysical Union selected Fine to present The Harald Sverdrup Lecture at their Fall meeting, which recognizes an individual for outstanding contributions and the promotion of cooperation in atmospheric and oceanographic research.

== Leadership ==
- 1981-1983 - Associate Program Director (Ocean Dynamics) at the National Science Foundation
- 1996-1998 - President of the Ocean Sciences Section of the American Geophysical Union
- 2018–present (current term expires 2023) - Board of Trustees member, University Corporation for Atmospheric Research (UCAR)

== Awards and honors ==
- 1993 — Fellow of the American Geophysical Union, for contributions to the understanding of deep ocean circulation and advancing an interdisciplinary approach to physical and chemical oceanography
- 1996 — Fellow of the American Association for the Advancement of Science
- 2001 — Fellow of the American Meteorological Society
- 2015 — Fellow of The Oceanography Society, for significant contributions to the understanding of the ocean circulation and ventilation. An excerpt from the nominating letter notes that "Rana's research contributions cover a wide range of scales from regional, to ocean basin, to inter-basin, to global scale; from low to high latitudes (both hemispheres); and from sea surface to sea floor. They deal with the full 3-D ocean circulation, quantifying the ventilation of the thermocline and deep ocean resulting from convection and subduction."
