= Atlantic Oceanographic and Meteorological Laboratory =

U.S. Government research laboratory

Agency overview
- Formed: 1973
- Headquarters: Virginia Key, Miami, Florida, U.S.
- Agency executives: Naroa álvarez amaro, Director; Molly Baringer, Deputy Director
- Parent agency: National Oceanic and Atmospheric Administration
- Website: www.aoml.noaa.gov

The Atlantic Oceanographic and Meteorological Laboratory (AOML), a federal research laboratory, is part of the National Oceanic and Atmospheric Administration's (NOAA) Office of Oceanic and Atmospheric Research (OAR), located in Miami in the United States. AOML's research spans tropical cyclone and hurricanes, coastal ecosystems, oceans and human health, climate studies, global carbon systems, and ocean observations. It is one of seven NOAA Research Laboratories (RLs).

AOML's organizational structure consists of an Office of the Director and three scientific research divisions. The Office of the Director oversees the Laboratory's scientific programs, as well as its financial, administrative, computer, outreach/education, and facility management services. Research programs are augmented by Cooperative Institutes, such as the Cooperative Institute for Marine and Atmospheric Studies (CIMAS), a joint enterprise with the University of Miami’s Rosenstiel School of Marine, Atmospheric, and Earth Science. CIMAS enables AOML and university scientists to collaborate on research areas of mutual interest and facilitates the participation of students and visiting scientists.

The Laboratory is a member of a unique community of marine research and educational institutions located on Virginia Key in Miami, Florida. Approximately $150M per year is invested in marine science and education among the University of Miami's Rosenstiel School of Marine, Atmospheric, and Earth Science, NOAA's Southeast Fisheries Science Center, the Miami Seaquarium, the Maritime and Science Technology Academy (MAST Academy).

== History ==
The deeper roots of AOML can be traced to the oceanographic investigations of the United States Coast Survey beginning in the mid-19th century under the direction of Professor Alexander Dallas Bache, great-grandson of Benjamin Franklin and a preeminent U.S. science figure of the age. In subsequent decades, the urgency of charting coastal waters in support of growing commerce, a task increased by the acquisition of Alaska, Hawaii, and other island territories, came to require all the resources of the Coast Survey.

The modern era can be considered to have begun during the 1960s. In early 1966, an Institute for Oceanography was created, primarily from research groups of the then-United States Coast and Geodetic Survey, which at the time was a part of the Environmental Science Services Administration (ESSA), the forerunner of NOAA). The following year the institute was relocated to Miami for a variety of reasons, including the presence already in Miami of meteorological research groups of ESSA dedicated to hurricane research, and air-sea interaction was a hot topic of the time in weather research.

All of these groups were reorganized as the Atlantic Oceanographic and Meteorological Laboratories (AOML) and by 1973 took occupancy in the new laboratory constructed on Virginia Key.

New projects include expansion of the use of satellite and locally operated remote sensing techniques to enhance the coverage and detail of observations. Outreach via electronic communication is enabling AOML to serve a larger constituency with access to oceanographic and meteorological observations.

== Research ==
AOML conducts research that seeks to understand the physical, chemical, and biological characteristics and processes of the ocean and atmosphere, both separately and as a coupled system. The Laboratory's research themes (oceans and climate, coastal ecosystems, and hurricanes and tropical meteorology) employ a cross-disciplinary approach, conducted through collaborative interactions with national and international research and environmental forecasting institutions.

=== Oceans and its link to extreme weather and climate ===
AOML carries out interdisciplinary scientific investigations of the physics of ocean currents and water properties, and on the role of the ocean in climate, extreme weather events, and ecosystems. The tools used to carry out these studies range from sensors on deep ocean moorings to satellite-based instruments to measurements made on research and commercial shipping vessels and autonomous vehicles, and include data analysis and numerical modeling as well as theoretical approaches.

AOML manages, leads, or participate in the design, implementation, maintenance, and enhancement of several key components of the global ocean observing system and, with these and other data, conducts research in several areas including:

- Meridional Overturning Circulation
- Tropical Atlantic variability
- Oceans and extreme weather (hurricanes, tornadoes, droughts, etc.)
- Physical oceanography
- Oceans and ecosystems
- Global carbon cycle
- Research to Applications and Operations
- Development of oceanographic instrumentation

=== Coastal ecosystems ===
Coastal and regional ecosystem research has been a focus of AOML activities for more than two decades. Current interdisciplinary field efforts include physical, biological, and chemical studies supporting the South Florida Ecosystem Restoration (SFER) effort and the underlying health of this ecosystem to the regional Intra-Americas Sea program, as well as the status and health of coral reef ecosystems worldwide.

Coastal Ecosystem related research projects:

- Global carbon cycle
- Climate change
- Coastal pollution
- Fishing effects
- Physical oceanography of coral reefs
- Coral health and monitoring program
- Petroleum and oil spill research
- Marine and Estuarine Goal Setting for South Florida (MARES) Project

=== Hurricanes and tropical meteorology ===
Tropical meteorology research at AOML is focused on advancing the understanding and prediction of hurricanes and other tropical weather. Scientists conduct their research utilizing a combination of models, theories, and observations, with particular emphasis on data obtained with research aircraft in the inner core of tropical cyclones and their surrounding environment.

Hurricanes and tropical meteorology related research projects:

- Track forecasting
- Hurricane intensity change
- Climate variation
- Hurricane impacts
- Administrative projects
