= Paquita Zuidema =

Dutch atmospheric and aerosol scientist

- Born: Holland, Netherlands
- Education: University of Illinois Urbana-Champaign; Massachusetts Institute of Technology; University of Washington; University of Colorado Boulder
- Scientific career
- Fields: Atmospheric science
- Workplaces: University of Miami

Paquita Zuidema is a Dutch atmospheric and aerosol scientist who researches cloud processes, cloud radiative impacts, and aerosol-cloud interactions. She is a professor and chair of the department of atmospheric sciences at the Rosenstiel School of Marine, Atmospheric, and Earth Science at the University of Miami.

== Life ==
Zuidema was born in Holland, the daughter of cultural anthropologist R. Tom Zuidema. She lived in Peru from the ages of four to seven. She later learned English when her father began a teaching position in Illinois. She earned a B.S. in physics from the University of Illinois Urbana-Champaign in 1983. She completed a M.S. in civil engineering from the Massachusetts Institute of Technology in 1987. She earned a M.S. in physics (1989) and a M.S. in atmospheric sciences (1993) from the University of Washington. Zuidema received a Ph.D. in atmospheric planetary and atmospheric science from the University of Colorado Boulder in 1999.

Zuimeda was first exposure to atmospheric sciences at age 29 when she encountered Atmospheric Radiation Measurement Climate Research Facility (ARM) data sets through her doctoral research. Thereafter I worked on the multi-angle imaging spectroradiometer (MISR) satellite project and at the Environmental Technology Laboratory in Boulder, Colorado Environmental Technology Lab in Boulder on Surface Heat Budget of the Arctic Ocean (SHEBA) data. Arriving at the University of Miami (UM) in 2005, she worked on Atlantic trade wind cumulus clouds and participated in the VAMOS Ocean-Cloud-Atmosphere-Land Study. She has focused on the biomass-burning aerosol and stratocumulus regime of the southeast Atlantic. She is active on the Atlantic panel of CLIVAR and is an associate editor for Atmospheric Chemistry and Physics. Zuimeda is a professor and chair of the department of atmospheric sciences at the Rosenstiel School of Marine, Atmospheric, and Earth Science.

Zumidema researches the characterization and understanding of cloud processes and cloud radiative impacts. This includes aerosol-cloud interactions, cloud mesoscale organization, and their variability at various time scales. She examines marine clouds, both low-latitude stratocumulus and cumulus, arctic mixed-phase, and tropical deep convection. Primarily an observationalist, she connects observations to modeling studies. She was a principal investigator for the Layered Atlantic Smoke Interactions with Smoke (LASIC) campaign on Ascension Island from 2016 to 2017. In 2024, she was elected a fellow of the American Meteorological Society.
