= Oscar Range =

Low mountain range in Western Australia

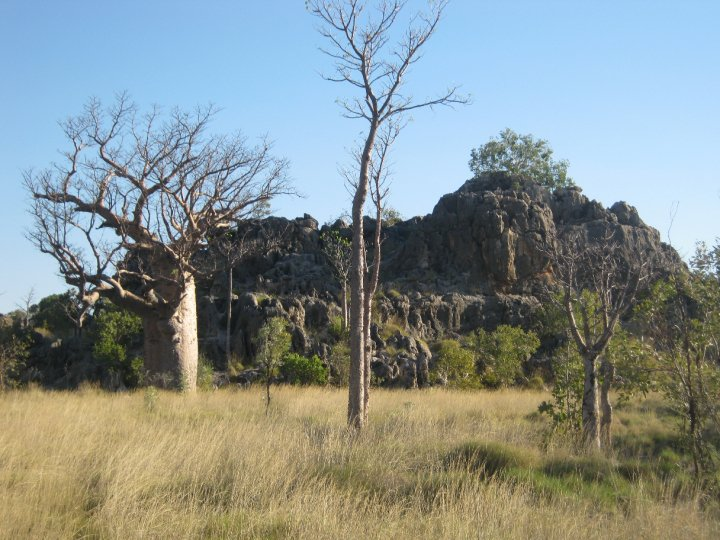
- The Devonian Reefs of the Oscar Range surround the range's quartzite core.

Highest point
- Peak: unnamed
- Elevation: 325 m (1,066 ft)

Naming
- Native name: Mowambini

Geography
- Location within Western Australia
- Country: Australia
- State: Western Australia
- Region: Canning Basin
- Range coordinates: 17°49′S 125°9′E

Geology
- Rock age: Proterozoic core / Devonian hills

The Oscar Range is a small, low mountain range in the Kimberley region of Western Australia. It is approximately 40 km long and 6–8 km wide. The range sits on the edge of the Lennard Shelf.

It consists of precambrian metamorphic quartzites and shales folded to produce a trellis type drainage system. Lower hills surrounding the range are made up of carbonates.

The range is known for the fossil reefs that surround its peaks. These Devonian reefs are exceptionally well preserved.

In Devonian times, the peaks of the Oscar Range were emergent as islands. The grouping of islands has been referred to as the Mowambini Archipelago, based on the Aboriginal name for the Oscar Range. The islands were surrounded by stromatoporoid reefs, which have now been exposed by erosion.
