= Virginia Key =

- Neighborhood of Miami
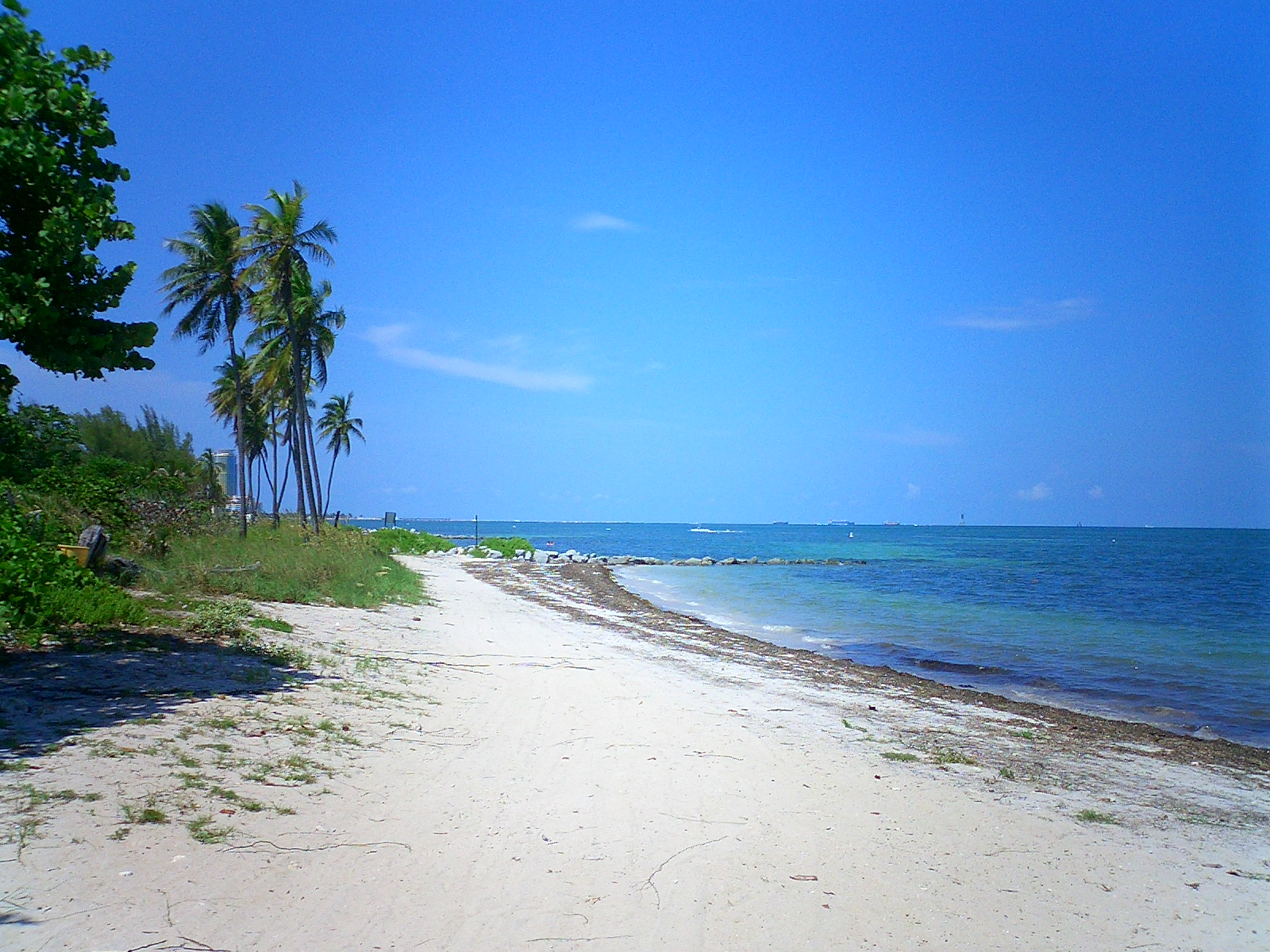
- Virginia Key Beach in Miami in 2004

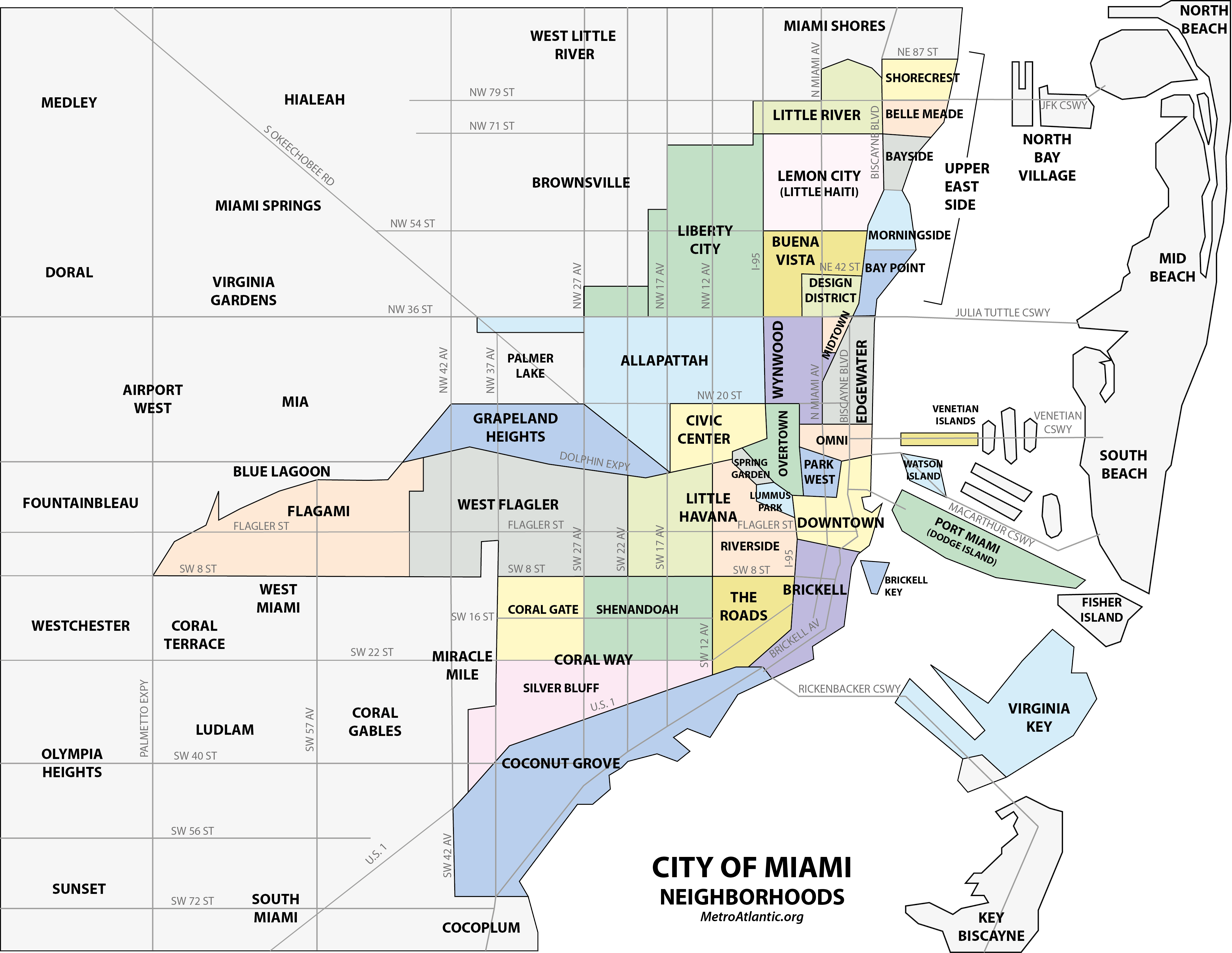
- Virginia Key in Miami
- Country: United States
- State: Florida
- County: Miami-Dade County
- City: Miami

Area
  - Total: 1.35 sq mi (3.5 km^{2})
- Time zone: UTC-05 (EST)
- ZIP Code: 33149
- Area codes: 305, 786

Virginia Key
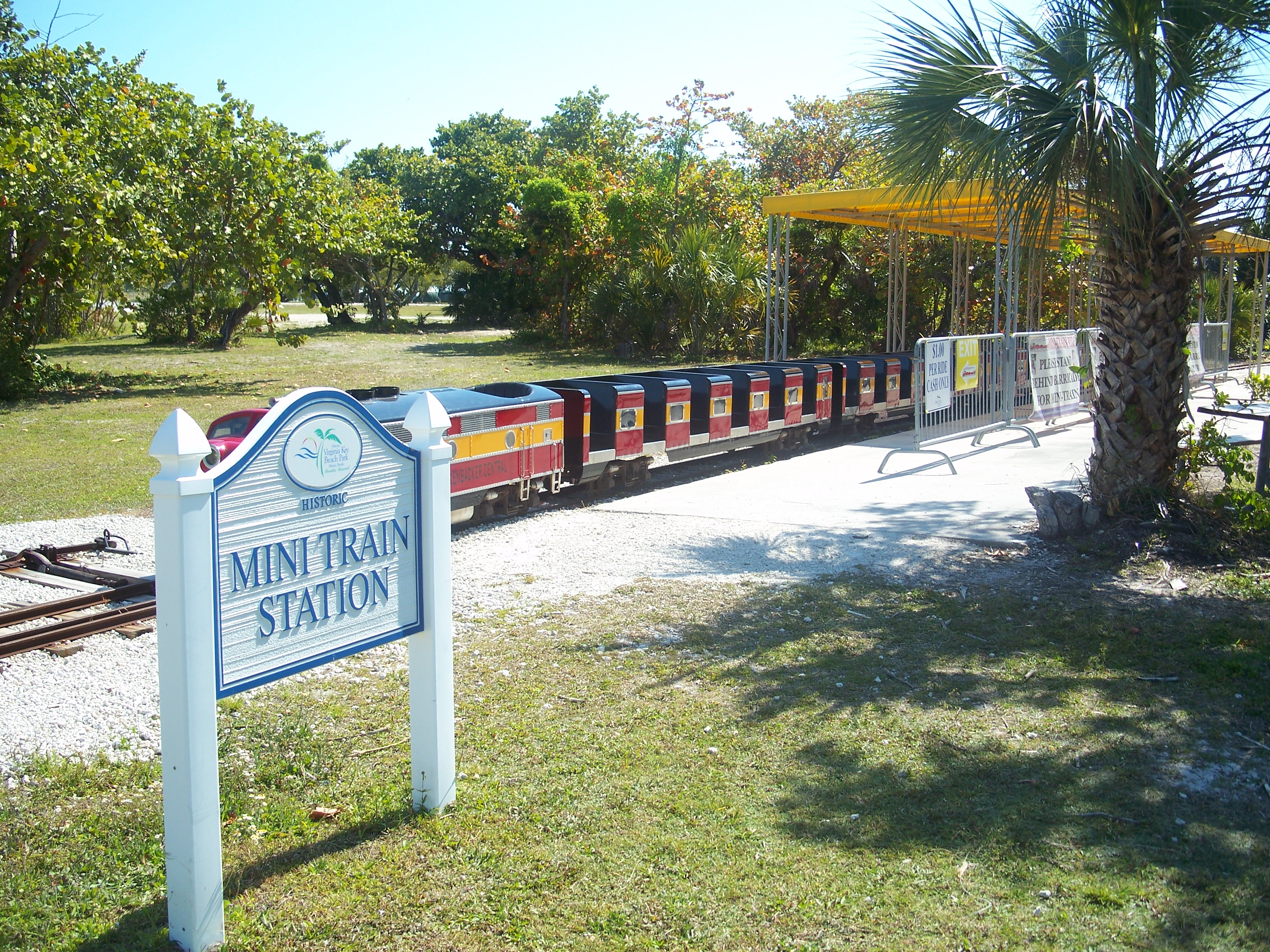
- Virginia Key railroad at the park
- Interactive map of Virginia Key
- Type: Municipal
- Location: Virginia Key, Miami, Florida, United States
- Area: 863 acres (3.49 km^{2})
- Created: 1945
- Operator: City of Miami
- Website: Virginia Key Beach Park
- Virginia Key Beach Park
- U.S. National Register of Historic Places
- Location within Miami Location within Florida Location within the United States
- Location: Virginia Key, Miami
- Coordinates: 25°44′11″N 80°9′20″W
- Built: 1945
- Architectural style: Masonry
- NRHP reference No.: 02000681
- Added to NRHP: June 28, 2002

Virginia Key is an 863-acre (3.49 km^{2}) barrier island in Miami, Florida. It is located in Biscayne Bay south of Brickell and north of Key Biscayne and is accessible from the mainland via the Rickenbacker Causeway.

The island is mainly occupied by the Virginia Key Beach Park, Miami Seaquarium, Miami-Dade's Central District Wastewater Treatment Plant, and the University of Miami's Rosenstiel School of Marine, Atmospheric, and Earth Science. Other facilities include the former Miami Marine Stadium, the National Marine Fisheries Service Southeast Fisheries Science Center, and an office of the US National Oceanic and Atmospheric Administration.

== History ==
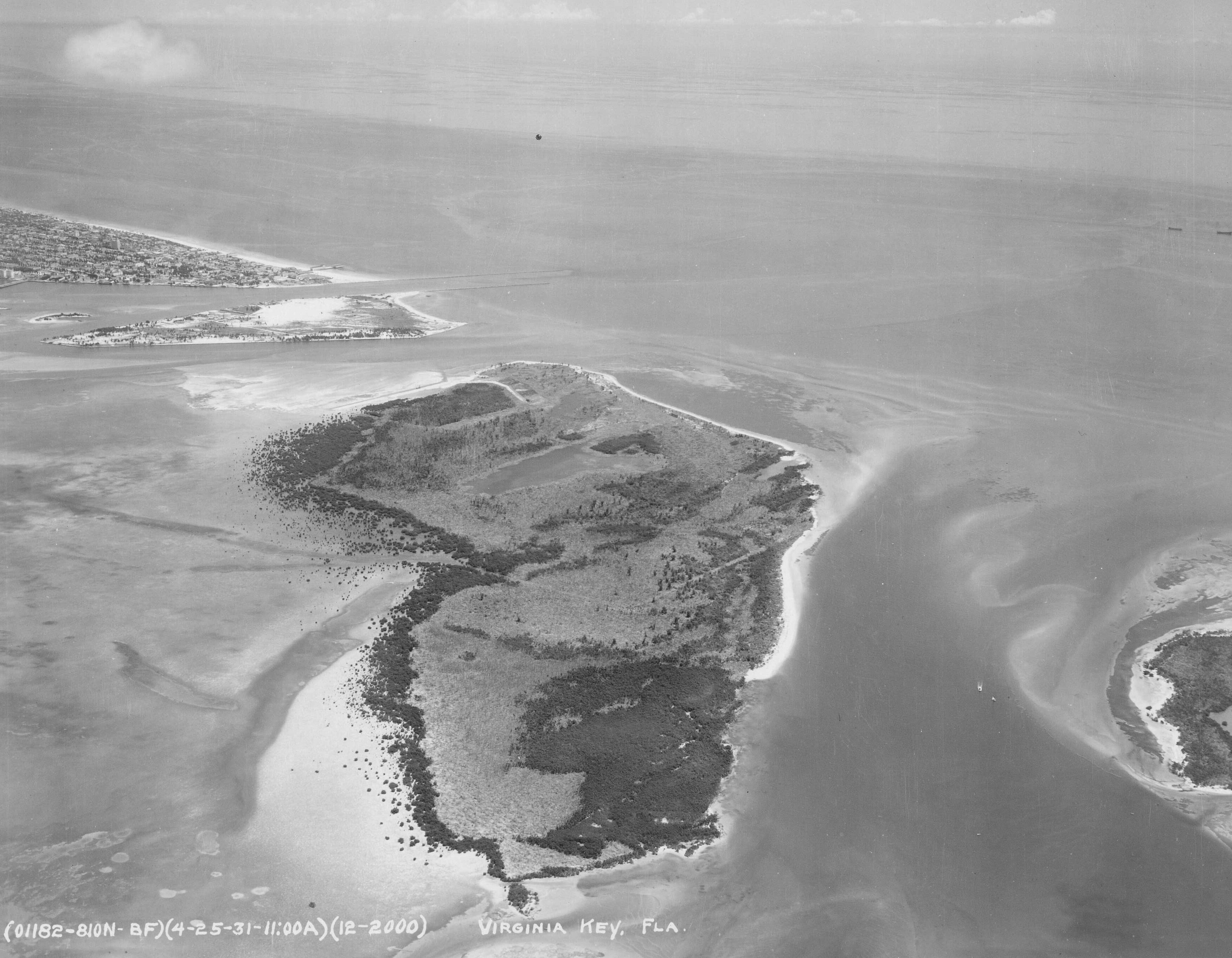
Virginia Key in 1931

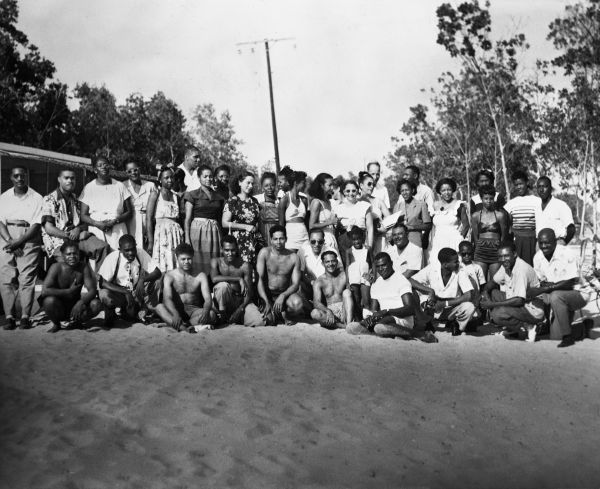
Virginia Key Beach in 1945

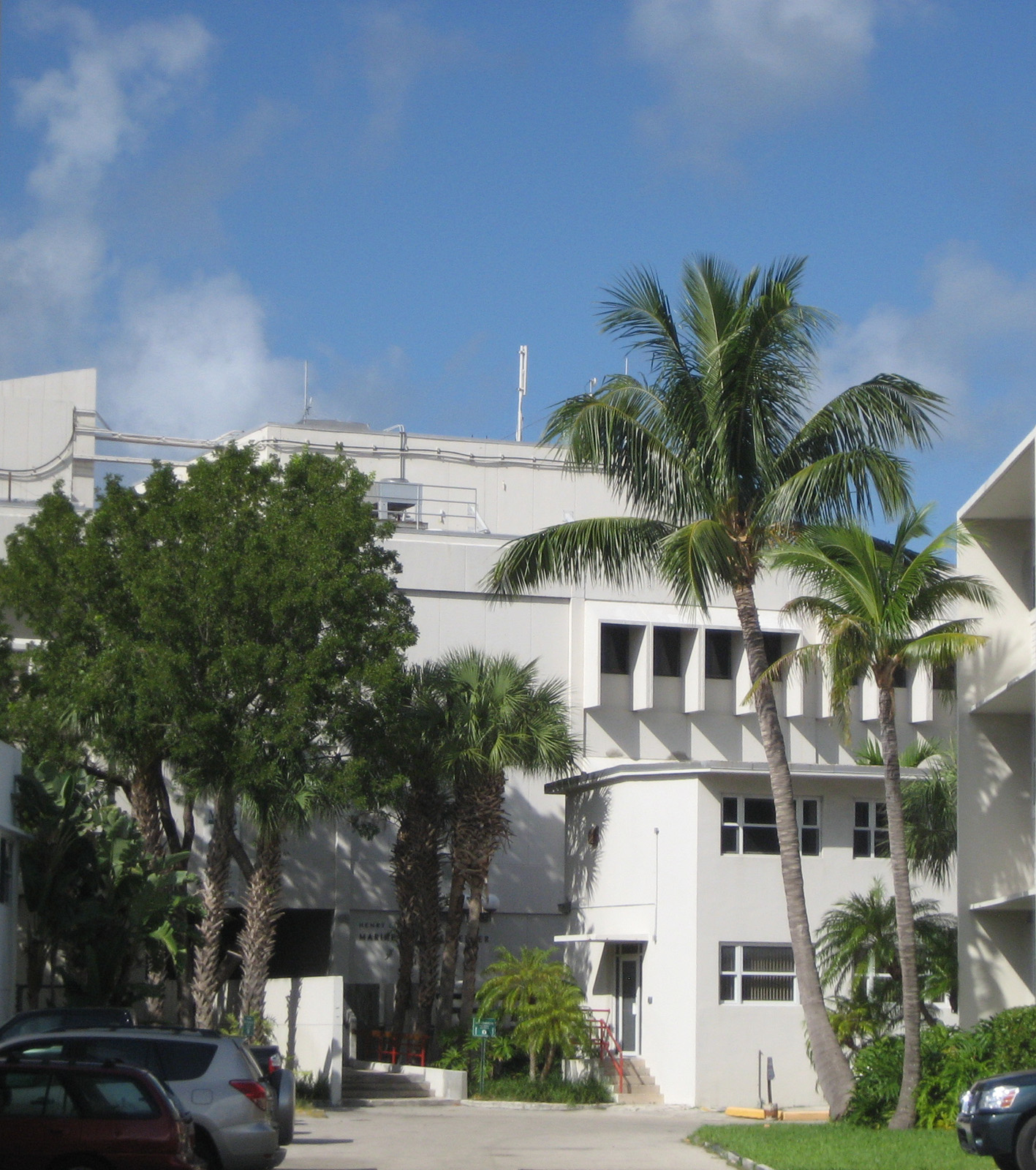
The Applied Marine Physics Building at the University of Miami's Rosenstiel School of Marine, Atmospheric, and Earth Science on Virginia Key

What is now Virginia Key was the southern end of a barrier island that extended from the New River inlet in Fort Lauderdale to just north of Key Biscayne. Early accounts by Spanish explorers indicated the existence of one or more inlets somewhere on the long spit of land enclosing the northern end of Biscayne Bay, but such inlets open and close over time. At the beginning of the 19th century, there was no inlet through the barrier island between the New River Inlet and Bear Cut, at the northern end of Key Biscayne. Hurricanes in 1835 and 1838 opened a new inlet, Narrows Cut (now known as Norris Cut), separating Virginia Key from what is now Fisher Island at the south end of Miami Beach.

The island was named by Frederick H. Gerdes of the United States Coast Survey in 1849. He noted that the island north of Key Biscayne had no name, and had not existed as an island until 'Narrows Cut' had broken through "ten or twelve" years before (i.e., the hurricane of 1835 or 1838). He described Virginia Key as three miles (5 km) long and one mile (1.6 km) wide (later, as five miles (8 km) long and one and a half miles (2.4 km) wide), with a fine Atlantic beach, but mostly covered with mangroves.

=== Virginia Key Beach Park ===
In May 1945, seven civil rights activists supported by the local NAACP chapter staged a "wade-in" at the whites’ only Baker's Haulover Beach in Dade County, Florida. Five men and two women protested Jim Crow era laws that denied access to recreation based on race. In a Miami emerging from World War II this meant "colored" people could not share with whites the legendary beaches along and in the waters of Biscayne Bay and the Atlantic Ocean.

The struggle for a "colored-only" beach in Miami, which was part of the civil rights movement of the 1950s and 1960s, fueled the anger of patriotic black servicemen who fought the racism of Nazi Germany only to return to a segregated America. Among the protesters was Attorney Lawson Thomas who later became the first Black appointed to Judge in the post-Reconstruction South. Lawyer Thomas remained on the beach, holding bail money for those who anticipated arrest. The NAACP had notified the local press and police of the time and place, hoping for arrests that would be central to a court challenge of local discrimination laws and policies. On instruction from local government representatives, police refused to cite the protestors, telling Thomas to contact County Commissioner Charles H. Crandon.

Local businessmen and government officials had privately conceded something had to be done about the race problem. The economy was – and is – heavily reliant upon its good reputation with tourists. A decision was made to compromise race restrictions on recreation by designating a "colored-only" beach on Virginia Key. Crandon and Thomas negotiated the establishment of the "Virginia Key Beach, a Dade County Park for the exclusive use of Negroes," (today, the Historic Virginia Key Beach Park). It opened on August 1, 1945.

There are several urban myths about the selection of Virginia Key by county officials, each with a kernel of truth – but there was an historic connection of at least several decades’ standing. A 1918 survey map of the "Abandoned Military Reservation" on Virginia Key located a "Negro Dancing Pavilion" on the island's southeastern shore of the "colored-only" beach. From 1945 to 1947, Miami's Blacks traveled to the beach exclusively by boat – public and private. The opening of the Rickenbacker Causeway in 1947 connected Virginia Key and Key Biscayne with the mainland and vehicular travel began.

The new Park enjoyed instant popularity. For a time, county government honored the "separate but equal" status of Virginia Key Beach with its white counterpart, Crandon Park on Key Biscayne. The original temporary buildings were replaced by permanent construction, a miniature railroad carried beachgoers around the park, and a seaside merry-go-round whirled riders of all ages. Still, Crandon Park was over 800 acres (3.2 km^{2}) with two miles (3 km) of beachfront and Virginia Key 82 acres (330,000 m^{2}) with a half-mile of beach.

When Crandon Park got a zoo, Virginia Key Beach got a pond with ornamental plants and so things began to change. When residents of Key Biscayne needed a place to dump their garbage and pump their sewage, the breezes on Virginia Key Beach turned sour, the water clouded with effluents. The long-term environmental impact has yet to be fully determined. Still, Virginia Key Beach remained a popular, even sacred place within Miami's Black community.

=== Park decline and restoration ===
Segregation of Miami-Dade beaches finally ended in the early 1960s with another protest led by the late Rev. Theodore Gibson, Garth C. Reeves, Oscar Range and others. Crandon Park and Virginia Key Beach would no longer be used exclusively by one race or another, but open for all to enjoy. When beaches closer to historically Black residential neighborhoods desegregated, Virginia Key Beach gradually declined both in use and upkeep. By the 1980s, picnicking families mingled with gay couples and nudists using Virginia Key Beach. In 1982, the County transferred the former colored-only park to the City of Miami with a deed restriction that it only be used as a park and that the City continued the level of services and maintenance. The City closed the Park shortly thereafter citing high maintenance costs.

Shuttered for two decades, Virginia Key Beach was eroded by storms, its buildings damaged and vandalized, and park lands invaded by exotic plants and animals. Beset by declining revenues, some City officials began to speculate over schemes to sell off the development rights on Virginia Key. As plans leaked, a local coalition formed among Miami's grassroots activists protesting any commercial development and asking for a complete restoration and re-opening of Miami's largest park and only public park on the Atlantic Ocean. The leadership at City Hall appointed an official community-based civil rights task force to provide a public forum for the park's future.

In time, the civil right's task force developed into a trust that was given the charge of re-opening the park as an open green space for a multi-cultural society. The restoration process was divided into two major areas: environmental and historical. The trust undertook the daunting task of removing all exotic vegetation from the park while replenishing the landscape with native vegetation. In August, 2002 the site was placed on the National Register of Historic Places and given a Florida Historical Marker.

On February 22, 2008, the Virginia Key Beach Park Trust re-opened the park to the public. Today, it is known as an ecological treasure which contains the largest mangrove wetland in the state. Historic landmarks such as the bathhouse, concession stand, carousel house, train tunnel, and picnic pavilions have all been renovated and opened for public use. The beach is open for wading only.

== Special features ==
The Atlantic Oceanographic and Meteorological Laboratory (AOML) is one of the Oceanic and Atmospheric Research (OAR) Facilities of the National Oceanic and Atmospheric Administration (NOAA). NOAA/AOML is a part of the US Department of Commerce (DOC) and is located in Miami, Florida. AOML's mission is to conduct basic and applied research in oceanography, tropical meteorology, atmospheric and oceanic chemistry, and acoustics. The research seeks to understand the physical characteristics and processes of the ocean and the atmosphere, both separately and as a coupled system.

Along the causeway onto Virginia Key is a long strip of bay front popular with windsurfers and sailors, called Hobie Beach after the Hobie Cats that set sail from the shore. It's also the only Miami-area beach that allows dogs. This island features nearby rest rooms and scenic view of the curving shoreline, making it a popular option for tailgate parties.

The Miami Seaquarium is a marine park on Virginia Key, opened in 1955.

The Rosenstiel School of Marine, Atmospheric, and Earth Science, founded by F.G. Walton Smith, is the University of Miami's graduate school of marine and atmospheric science. Dr. Roni Avissar is the Dean of the Rosenstiel School . Located on a 16-acre (65,000 m^{2}) campus on Virginia Key in Miami, it is the only tropical applied and basic marine and atmospheric research institute of its kind in the continental United States. The Rosenstiel School conducts a broad range of research on local, regional, national and global levels. More than 100 Ph.D. faculty members, 150 graduate students and a research support and administrative staff of 250 comprise the academic community.

The Maritime and Science Technology (MAST) Academy public magnet school is located on Virginia Key. Several hundred high school specially-selected students from Miami get their education at MAST Academy.

A mountain biking park is located on the northern end of Virginia Key. Constructed by the Virginia Key Bicycle Club, the park features novice, intermediate and advanced trails. It is located just past Virginia Key Outdoor Center, just down the road from the former Jimbo's location on Arthur Lamb Jr. road on the north point of Virginia Key.

== Education ==
=== K-12 education ===
Miami-Dade County Public Schools serves Virginia Key. The Key Biscayne K-8 Center in Key Biscayne serves Virginia Key. Middle school students may attend Ponce de Leon Middle School in Coral Gables instead of the Key Biscayne School. High school students are zoned to Coral Gables Senior High School.

The magnet school MAST Academy is in Virginia Key.

=== Post-secondary education ===
The University of Miami's Rosenstiel School of Marine, Atmospheric, and Earth Science is located on Virginia Key.

== In popular culture ==
- Scenes from Ace Ventura: Pet Detective, a 1994 comedy, were filmed on Virginia Key.

== See also ==
- Neighborhoods in Miami
