= Rosenstiel School of Marine, Atmospheric, and Earth Science =

Research institute in Miami, Florida, US

Coordinates: 25.732479°N 80.163245°W

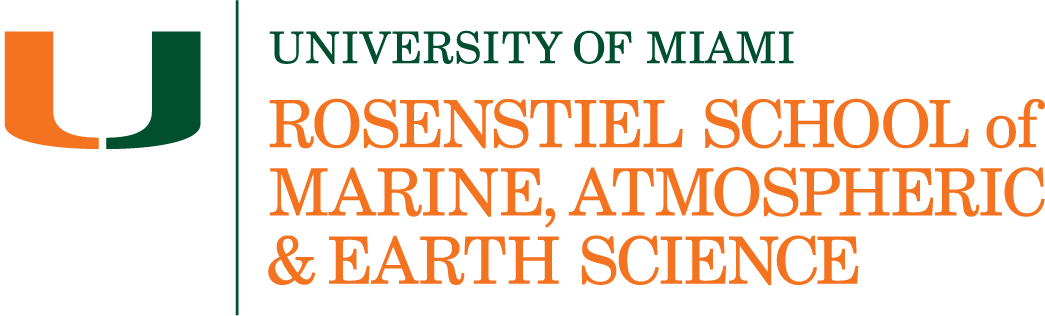
- The Rosenstiel School of Marine, Atmospheric, and Earth Science's logo
- Former name: University of Miami Marine Laboratory
- Motto: Magna est veritas
- Motto in English: Great is the truth
- Type: Private university
- Established: 1943
- Affiliations: University of Miami
- Dean: Ben Kirtman
- Faculty: 95
- Undergraduates: 400
- Postgraduates: 220
- Location: Virginia Key, Miami, Florida, U.S.
- Campus: Island
- Website: earth.miami.edu

The Rosenstiel School of Marine, Atmospheric, and Earth Science is a school of the University of Miami, a private university in Florida, United States. It focuses on the study of oceanography, atmospheric, and earth sciences. The school is located on Virginia Key in Miami, approximately 8 miles (13 km) east of the university's main Coral Gables campus.

Founded in 1943, the University of Miami's Rosenstiel School is the only subtropical applied and basic marine, atmospheric, and earth research institute in the continental United States. The school is also home to SUSTAIN, the world's largest hurricane simulation tank.

Up until 2008, Rosenstiel School was solely a graduate school within the University of Miami, though it jointly administrated an undergraduate program with the University of Miami's College of Arts and Sciences. In 2008, Rosenstiel School launched an undergraduate program, granting both Bachelor of Science in Marine and Atmospheric Science (BSMAS) and Bachelor of Arts in Marine Affairs (BAMA) undergraduate degrees and Master's degrees. Doctorate degrees are awarded to Rosenstiel School students by the University of Miami's Graduate School.

The Rosenstiel School's research includes the study of marine life, including aplysia and coral, climate change, tropical cyclones, air-sea interactions, coastal ecology, and oceanography law. The school operates a marine research vessel and has a research site at an inland sinkhole.

== History ==
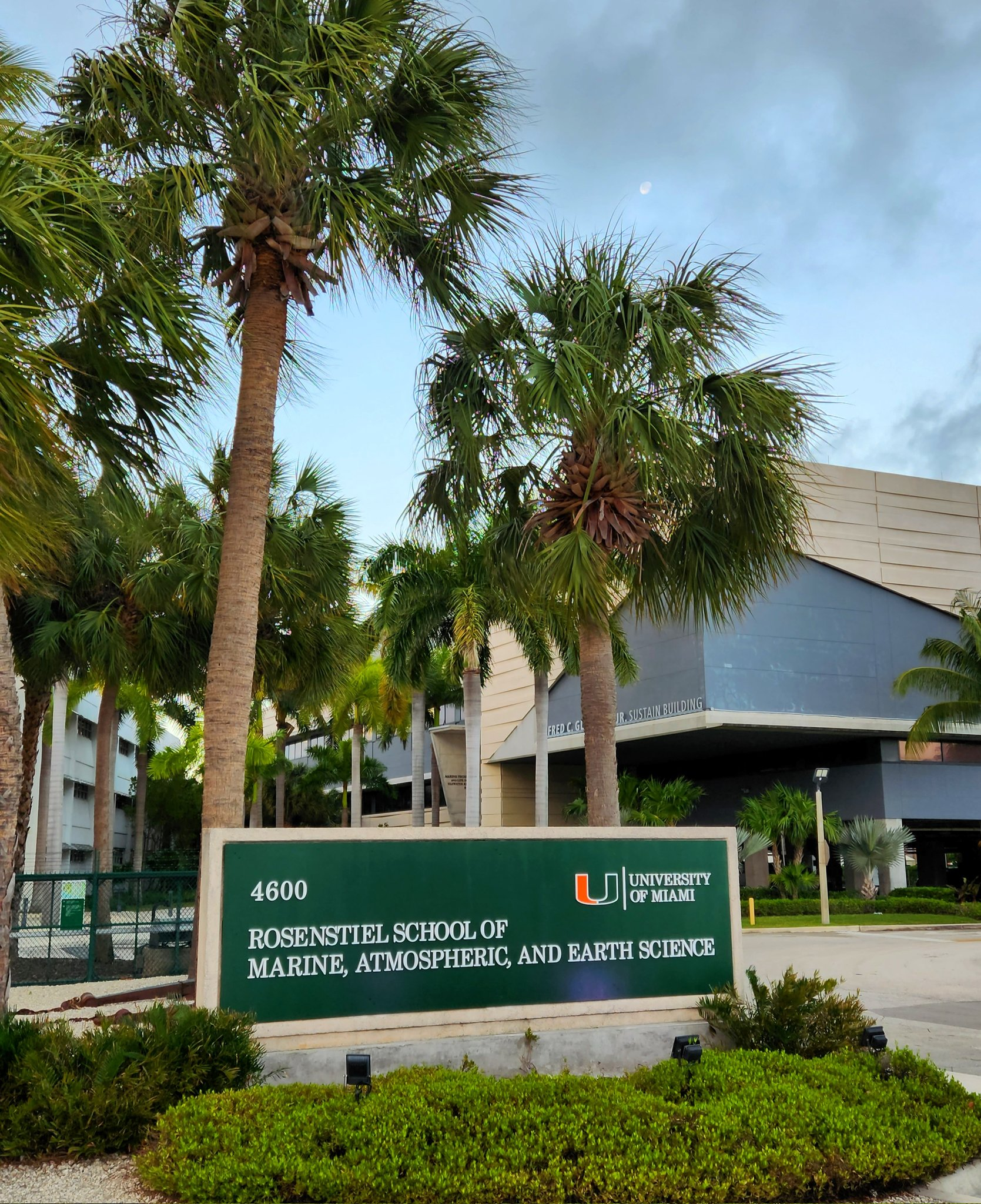
The entrance sign to the University of Miami's Rosenstiel School of Marine, Atmospheric, and Earth Science on Virginia Key, February 2023

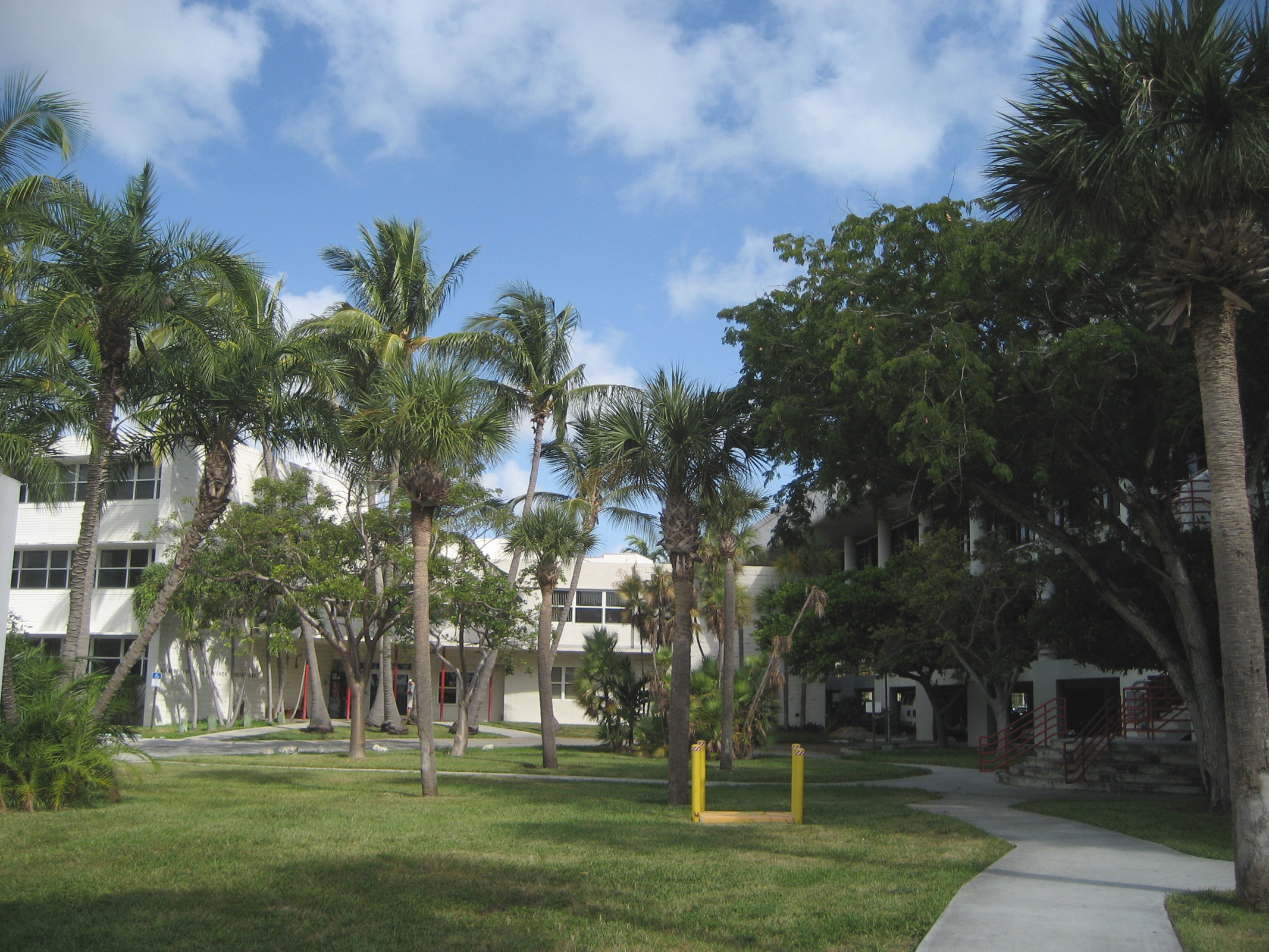
The University of Miami's Rosenstiel School courtyard in September 2007

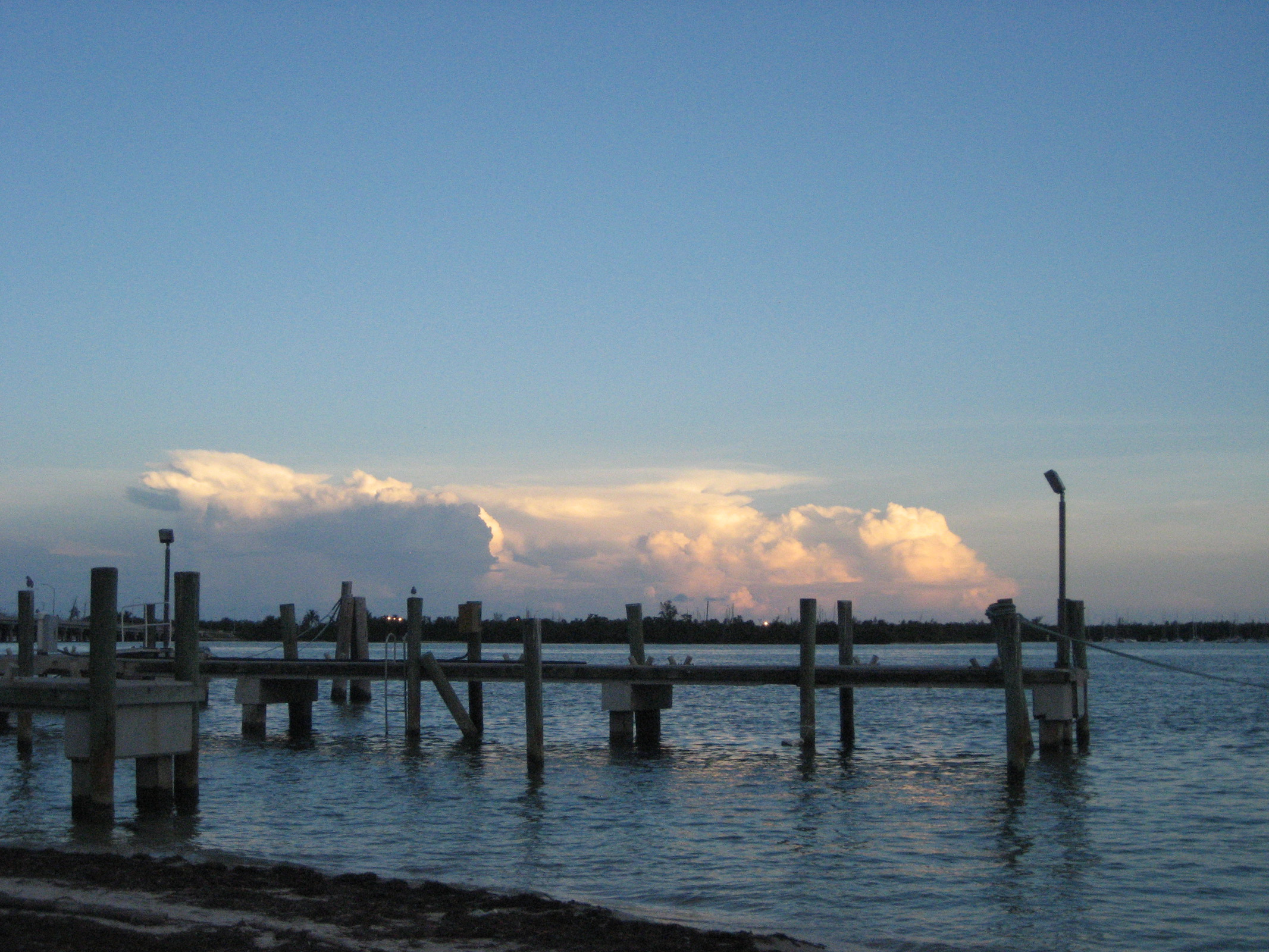
Dock at the University of Miami's Rosenstiel School of Marine and Atmospheric Science on Virginia Key at sunset, September 2007

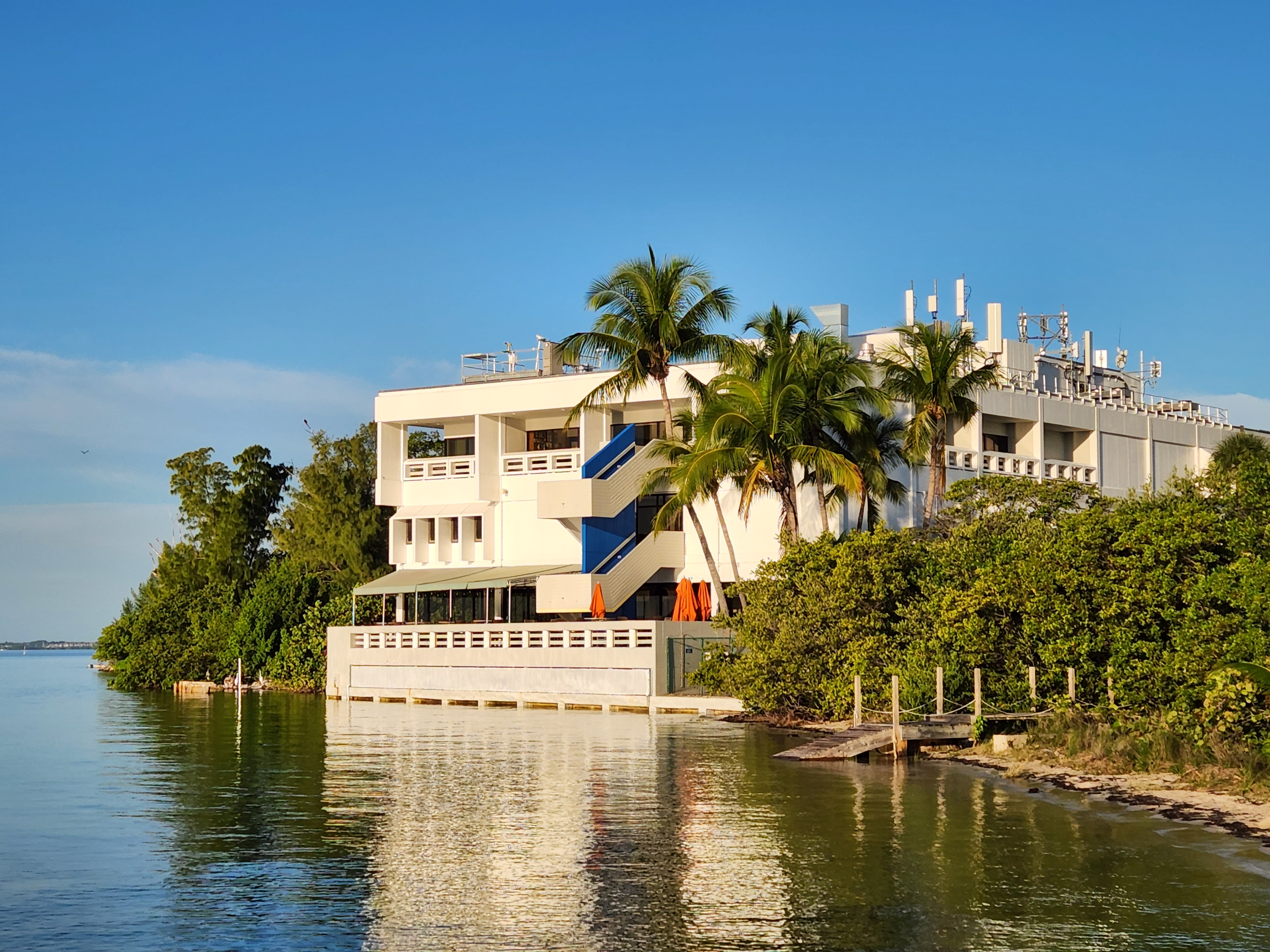
The University of Miami's Rosenstiel School of Marine, Atmospheric, and Earth Science Marine Science Center, December 2022

In 1940, University of Miami president Bowman Foster Ashe recruited F.G. Walton Smith, a British marine biologist who was working in the Bahamas to join the University of Miami's Department of Zoology and develop of a marine laboratory at the university.

In 1943, the Board of Trustees of the University of Miami established the Marine Laboratory for the University. They invited researchers and oceanographers to associate themselves with the laboratory whose three original objectives were teaching, basic research, and applied marine research. The laboratory focused on subjects specific to a tropical environment. Initially, the Marine Lab was located in a private boathouse on an estate on Belle Isle in Miami Beach. In 1945, when the boathouse became structurally unsafe, the lab moved to a converted apartment building in Coral Gables, Florida near the main campus.

In 1947, a delegation from Dade County prompted the Florida State Legislature to support development of a state Marine Laboratory in conjunction with the UM lab. It reported to the State Board of Conservation, which had no marine research facility and little budget of its own at the time. The relationship lasted for 12 years until the state of Florida built the board a lab in St. Petersburg.

Since 1951, the School has published the Bulletin of Marine Science, a peer-reviewed scientific journal on ecology, fisheries management, geology, geophysics, marine biology, oceanography, meteorology, and related topics.

In 1953, the School's classrooms and laboratories were built at the current Virginia Key location. It was renamed Institute of Marine Science in 1961, it became part of the University of Miami's School of Environmental and Planetary Sciences.

In 1969, the institution was made into an independent school and named to honor Lewis and Dorothy Rosenstiel after a major contribution from Rosenstiel's foundation to support progress in atmospheric and marine sciences.

In 1977, the school began a joint undergraduate program with Miami's College of Arts & Sciences. The school bought Research vessels and built more facilities to further research projects. From 2003 to 2008, the school operated Pew Institute for Ocean Science as a joint venture with the Pew Charitable Trusts; in 2008, the program relocated to Stony Brook University on Long Island.

In 2008, the University of Miami's Rosenstiel School took over administration of the university's undergraduate Marine Science, Marine Affairs, and Meteorology programs.

Also in 2008, the school's library merged with the central University of Miami Library. Recently, the Rosenstiel School started unique a one-year Master of Professional Science degree program aimed at students planning non-research careers in business, government, or non-profit organizations.

In June 2022, the faculty voted to change the name of the school to the Rosenstiel School of Marine, Atmospheric, and Earth Science, reflecting the strengths in geosciences as well as the ocean and atmospheric sciences.

== Academics ==
While the graduate programs are conducted by Rosenstiel School faculty who report to the dean of the Rosenstiel School, the University of Miami's Graduate School awards the school's graduate degrees. Rosenstiel School offers a joint program with the University of Miami School of Law, which awards its students both a Juris Doctor degree and a Master of Arts in Marine Affairs and Policy. The school also administers the University of Miami's undergraduate programs in marine science, marine affairs, and meteorology on the university's main Coral Gables campus.

The Rosenstiel School is divided into five academic departments:

- Atmospheric Sciences
- Environmental Science and Policy
- Marine Biology and Ecology
- Marine Geosciences
- Ocean Sciences

In addition to its academic departments, Rosenstiel School has several research units: Oceans and Human Health Center, National Resource for Aplysia, National Center for Coral Reef Research, Center for Southeastern Tropical Advanced Remote Sensing (CSTARS), and National Institute of Environmental Health Sciences. As of 2011, 358 professors and scientists conduct research programs and teach at Rosenstiel School and the University of Miami's main campus. Of these, 81 are regular full-time faculty members.

The school operates F.G. Walton Smith, a research vessel. Designed to meet the school's specifications, the catamaran was put on water in 2000. It is equipped with a special sea water flow system that can take samples. The on-board lab can perform chemical analysis of those water samples. It also has transducers for measuring ocean currents, sub-bottom profiling, and deep water bathymetry. In response to the Deepwater Horizon oil spill, the vessel was reassigned to environmental monitoring of affected areas and to track underwater plumes of oil.

Rosenstiel School's research invertebrate museum houses one of the world's most extensive collections of invertebrate tropical marine life with 400,000 specimens. It includes Atlantic tropical marine invertebrates. The collection consists of 60,000 specimen lots, out of which 38,900 are cataloged and identified species.

Since 2005, Rosenstiel School has conducted an underwater photography contest that draws international submissions. It also makes underwater photographs available through its Digital Atlas of Marine Species and Locations, which is a database that includes photos of specific marine species.

Since 1951, Rosenstiel School has published Bulletin of Marine Science a scientific journal which publishes research papers in marine subject areas covered by the school. It is published four times a year.

The United States National Research Council ranked graduate research programs based on 2008 data, and the Rosenstiel School ranked 11th to 40th among Oceanography, Atmospheric Sciences, and Meteorology Rankings. Rosenstiel School entering graduate students' average quantitative Graduate Record Examination score was 681.

== Campus ==
The University of Miami's Rosenstiel School's Virginia Key 18-acre (73,000 m^{2}) campus includes classroom facilities, laboratories, a dock, and a student center. The center, called F. G. Walton Smith Commons, holds a cafeteria and a bar (aka "the wet lab") that was rated as one of Miami's best secrets by Miami New Times in 2008. The campus features mangroves, sea grape trees, and dune plants to protect its sand dunes and the campus from storm damage. In 2009, UM received a $15 million federal grant to help construct a new $43.8 million, 56,500 square feet (5,250 m^{2}) Marine Technology and Life Sciences Seawater Research Building. The Virginia Key campus is located at a 65-acre (260,000 m^{2}) marine research and education park that is also home to two National Oceanic and Atmospheric Administration (NOAA) research laboratories and the Maritime and Science Technology Academy magnet school.

The school also operates a 76-acre (310,000 m^{2}) site on mainland Miami-Dade County that was formerly the United States Naval Observatory Secondary National Time Standard Facility, which already had buildings and a 20M antenna used for Very Long Baseline Interferometry (VLBI). Rosenstiel School's Center for Southeastern Tropical Advanced Remote Sensing (CSTARS) and Richmond Satellite Operations Center (RSOC) have research facilities located on what is now named the Richmond Campus.

In the 1990s, the school hosted the Miami Hoshuko, a part-time Japanese school for Japanese citizens and ethnic Japanese people in the area. While there, Miami Hoshuko used ten classrooms, a library, and a cafeteria facility.

== Research ==
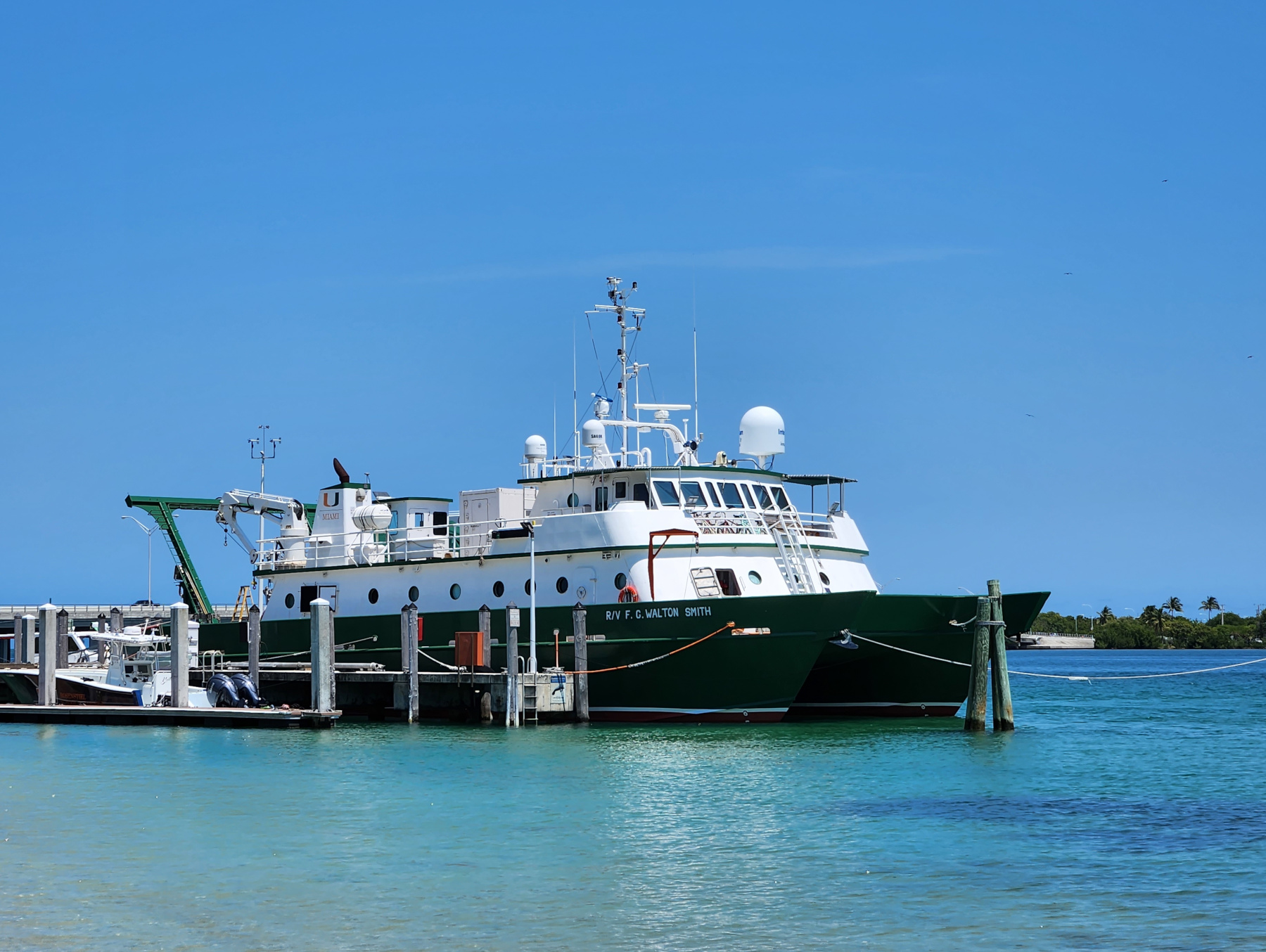
The R/V F.G. Walton Smith, a research catamaran utilized by the Rosenstiel School and named for University of Miami professor F.G. Walton Smith whose initial marine-related research led to the school's 1943 founding. May 2023.

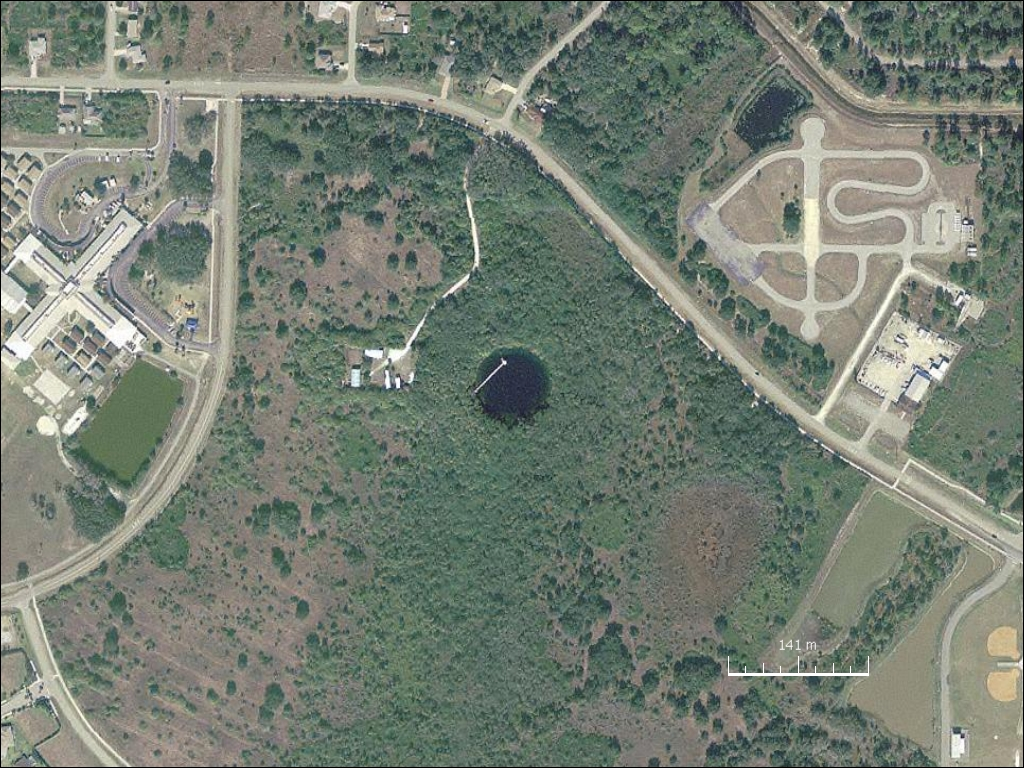
A June 2010 NASA satellite photo of Little Salt Spring in North Port, Florida, which houses Rosenstiel School research facilities, field laboratories, and dormitories. The dock over the water is used by research divers for underwater excavations.

As of 2008, the University of Miami's Rosenstiel School receives $50 million in annual external research funding. Laboratories at Virginia Key are equipped with specialized instruments including a salt-water wave tank, the five-tank Conditioning and Spawning Systems, multi-tank Aplysia Culture Laboratory, Controlled Corals Climate Tanks, and DNA analysis equipment. The Richmond Campus' CSTARS provides Rosenstiel School with a near-real-time weather satellite downlink. Rosenstiel School also operates Bimini Biological Field Station, an array of oceanographic high-frequency radar along the U.S. east coast, and its Bermuda aerosol observatory.

Research projects at Rosenstiel School are in the domain of atmospheric and marine sciences and include:

- Coral reef research, focusing on corals survival in a new climate conditions; coral reef protection
- Field programs evaluating trace gas chemistry and transport
- The aquaculture program
- Climate change modeling
- Tropical weather, climate, and atmospheric/oceanic circulations
- Air-sea interactions research through buoys, remote sensing, analysis in situ, a wave tank laboratory, numerical modeling;
- Volcanoes in the Pacific, Everglades water level measurements and subsidence through satellite images
- Studies of coastal quality and their impact on human health.

Rosenstiel School's Marine Affairs and Policy Division conducts archaeological and paleontological research at Little Salt Spring in Sarasota County. The site was donated to the University of Miami in 1982. Rosenstiel School also hosts the National Center for Coral Reef Research (NCORE), which works to understand, conserve and manage coral reefs worldwide.

Rosenstiel School has focused significant resources to studying the Deepwater Horizon oil spill and its long term environmental effect. The school is an active member of the State of Florida's Oil Spill Academic Task Force that works with the Florida Department of Environmental Protection on spill issues. In the summer of 2010, a CIMAS team working with the research vessel Walton Smith was able to document a 23-mile (37 km) long oil plume extending toward Dry Tortugas.

The quality of the school is evaluated through peer-reviewed competition for faculty research grants. In addition, each year, the National Science Foundation conducts a nationwide student competition for Graduate Research Award Fellowship, and in 2010, five Rosenstiel School students received such awards with two additional honorable mentions.

=== Cooperative Institute for Marine and Atmospheric Studies ===
Since 1977, the Cooperative Institute for Marine and Atmospheric Studies (CIMAS), a scientific partnership between the University of Miami and NOAA, has been studying climate change, air-sea interactions and coastal ecology.

== Notable faculty ==
- Frederick Bayer (Marine Biology)
- Lisa Beal (Oceanography)
- Amy C. Clement (Atmospheric science)
- Cesare Emiliani (Geology and Geophysics) - "founder of paleoceanography"
- Rana Fine (Marine and Atmospheric Chemistry), physical oceanographer
- Samuel H. Gruber (Marine Biology and Fisheries)
- Roger Lhermitte (Radar Meteorology)
- José Carlos Millás (Meteorology)
- Fred Tappert (Applied Marine Physics)
- Paquita Zuidema (Atmospheric science)

== See also ==
- List of University of Miami alumni
- University of Miami
