= List of University of Miami alumni =

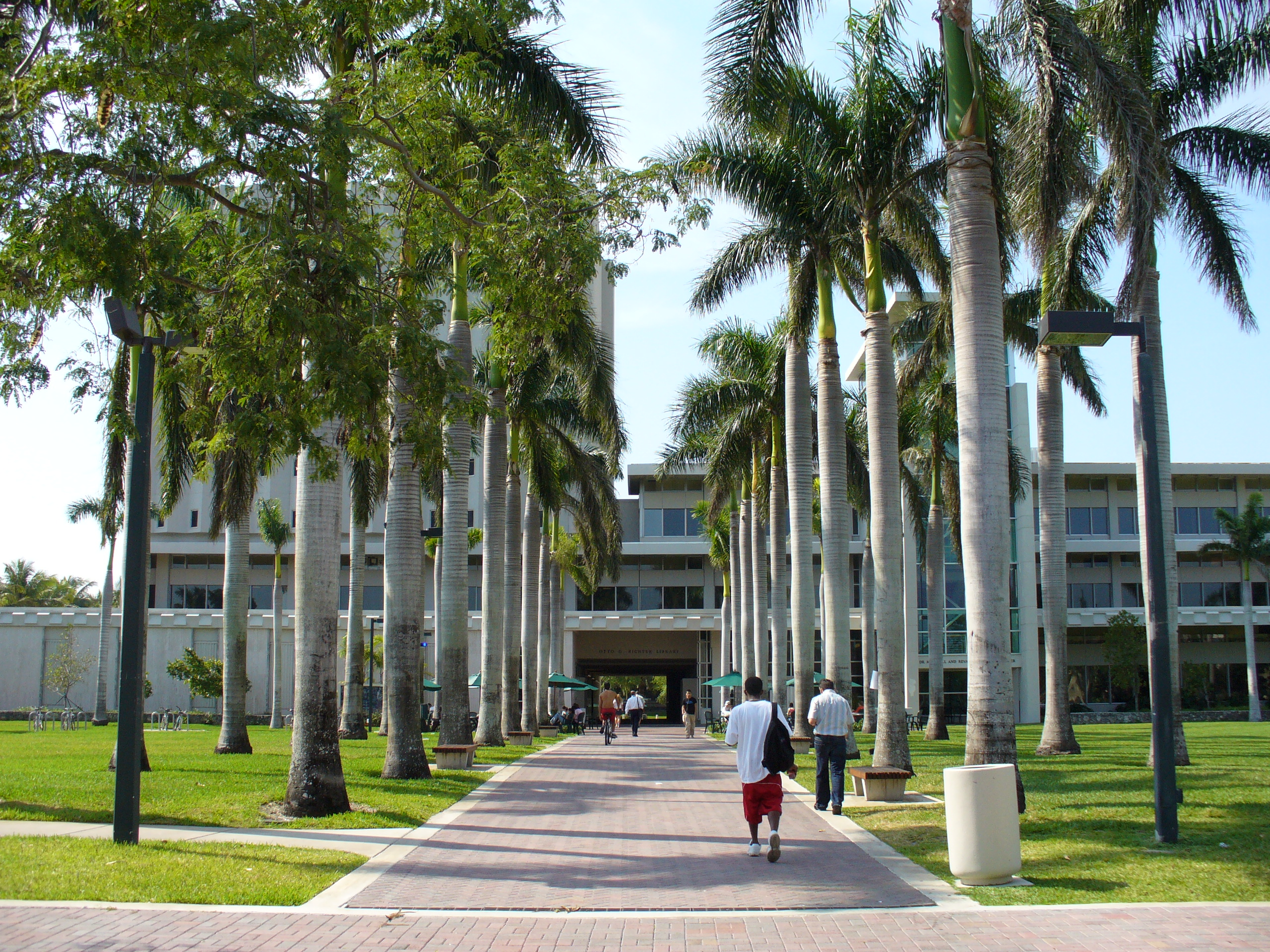
The campus of the University of Miami in Coral Gables, Florida

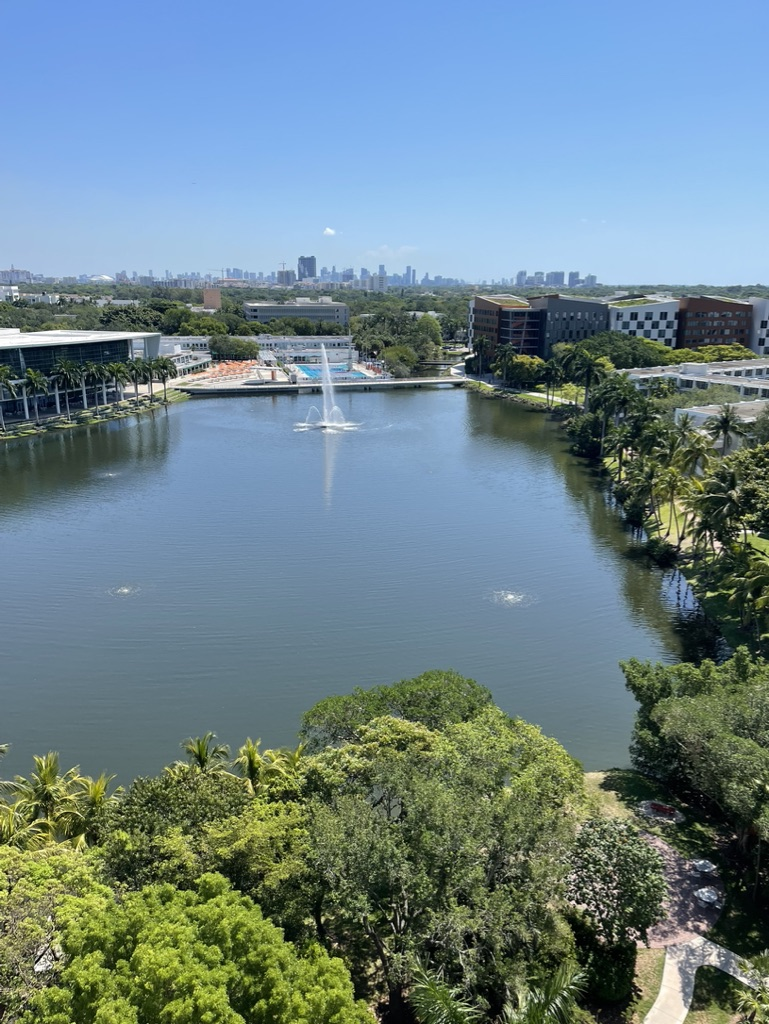
Lake Osceola on the University of Miami campus with the Miami skyline in the background

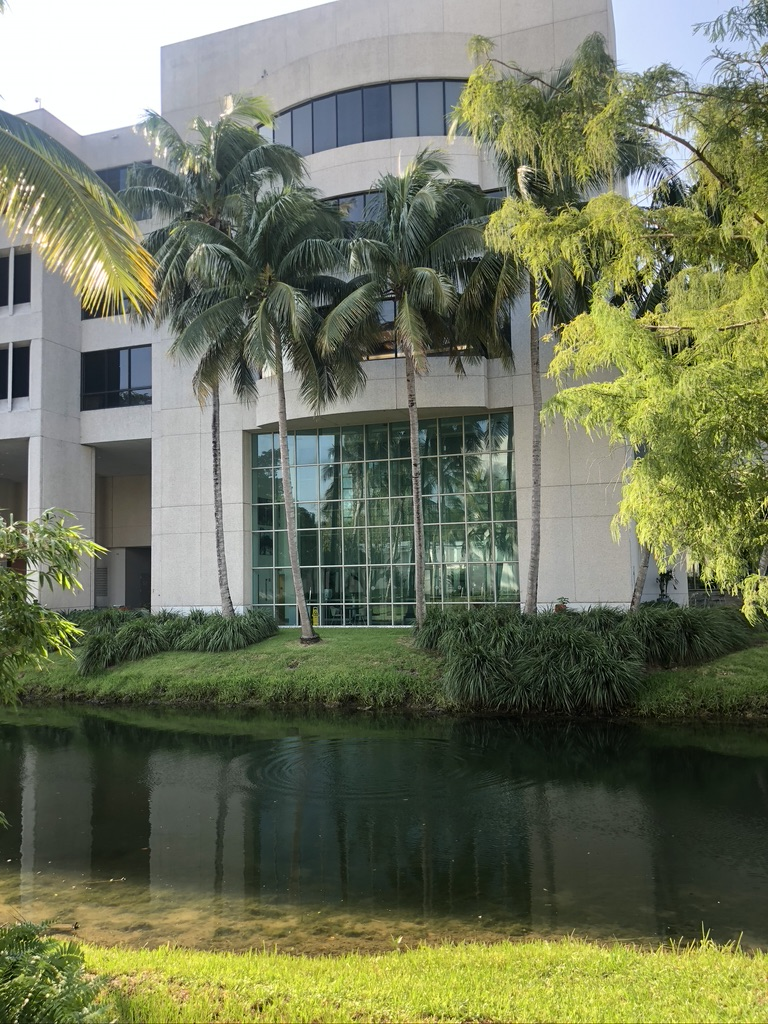
Miami Herbert Business School, one of the nation's top-ranked business schools, on the University of Miami campus

This list of University of Miami alumni includes academics, business executives, scientists, heads of state and governmental agencies, political and nonprofit leaders, television and film personalities, musicians, professional athletes, artists, authors, writers, and others.

Founded in 1925, the University of Miami is located in Coral Gables, Florida, 7 miles (11 km) south of Downtown Miami in the Miami metropolitan area, the largest metropolitan area in Florida, eighth-largest metropolitan area in the nation, and 70th-largest metropolitan area in the world. The university is a private research university that offers 154 undergraduate, 150 master's, and 70 doctoral degree programs across 10 schools and colleges and over 350 majors and programs.

The University of Miami is a major research university with $520 million in annual research and sponsored program expenditures, making it the 61st-largest university for research in the nation. Its undergraduate academic admissions standards are the highest of any university or college in the state of Florida, and the university is Carnegie-classified as "Doctoral Universities: Very High Research Activity." University of Miami faculty include globally-recognized leaders in most academic disciplines, including four Nobel Prize winners to date.

With over 21,000 faculty and staff, the University of Miami is the second-largest employer in Miami-Dade County, the most populous county in Florida and seventh-most populous county in the nation. The University of Miami has been regularly ranked one of the top universities in the U.S. by U.S. News & World Report, which ranks it the 64th-best national university as of 2026. The University of Miami campus spans 240 acres (0.97 km^{2}) and has over 5,700,000 square feet (530,000 m^{2}) of buildings. It has an endowment of $1.71 billion as of 2025.

The university's athletic teams are collectively known as the Miami Hurricanes and compete in Division I of the National Collegiate Athletic Association. Its football team has won five national championships since 1983 and its baseball team has won four national championships since 1982.

== Academia ==
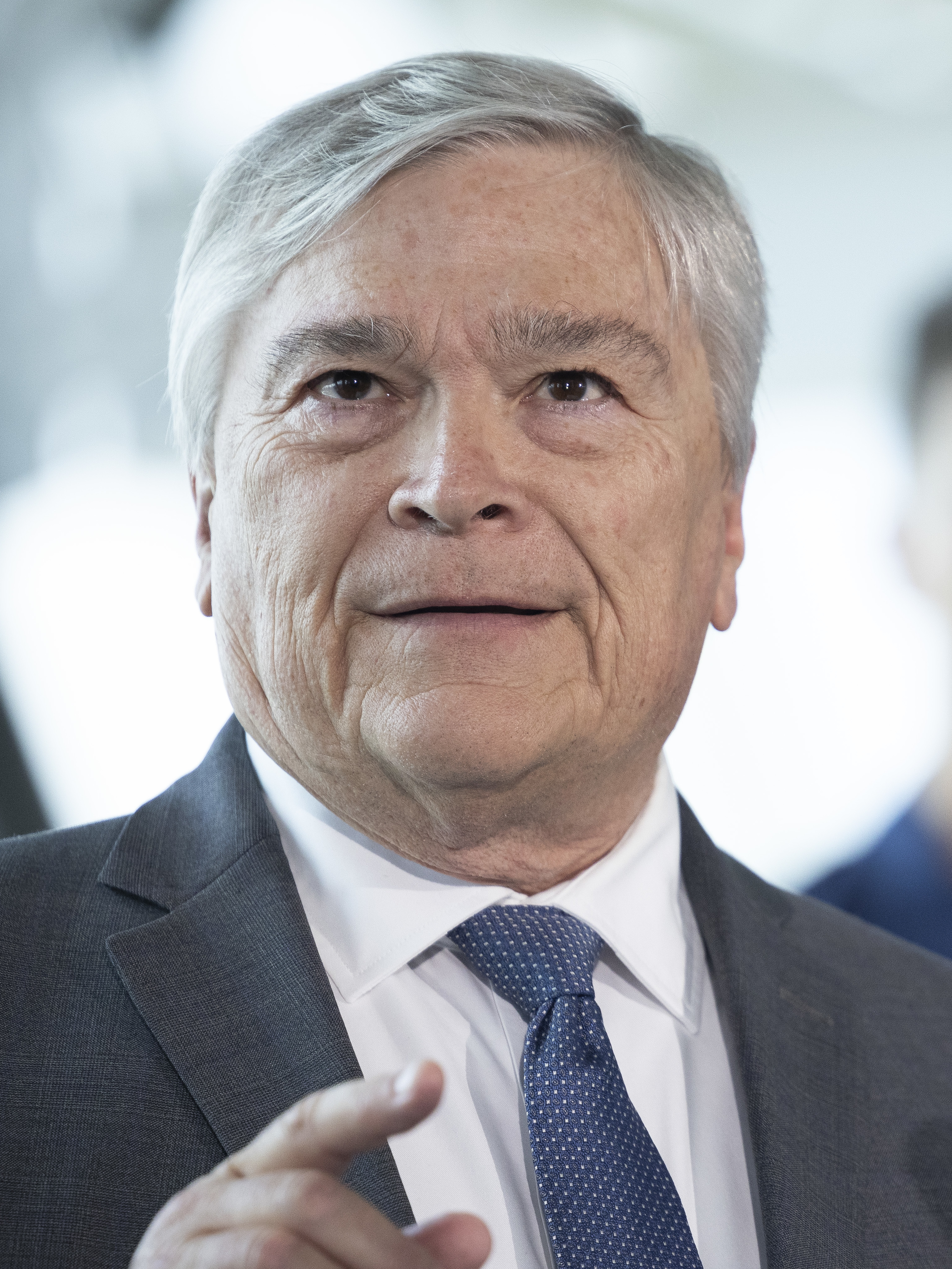
Eric J. Barron

| Alumnus | Notability | Reference |
|---|---|---|
| Eric J. Barron | former president, Penn State University and Florida State University, and former National Center for Atmospheric Research | |
| Irma Becerra-Fernandez | seventh president, Marymount University, and former provost, St. Thomas University | |
| Robert A. Bryan | former interim president, University of Florida, University of Central Florida, and University of South Florida, and English literature scholar | |
| Betty Castor | former president, University of South Florida, former president, National Board for Professional Teaching Standards, and former Education Commissioner of Florida | |
| James W. Crawford III | president, Texas Southern University, and former president, Felician University | |
| Warren Dean | former historian | |
| Joanna Falco-Leshin | professor of English and humanities, Miami Dade College | |
| Damián J. Fernández | 10th president, Warren Wilson College, and former 5th president, Eckerd College | |
| Mónica Ponce de León | dean, Princeton University School of Architecture | |
| Walter Lynn | professor, founder, and director of Cornell University Center for Environmental Quality Management | |
| LaVerne E. Ragster | former president, University of the Virgin Islands | |
| Bertha Vazquez | education director, Center for Inquiry | |

== Art and literature ==
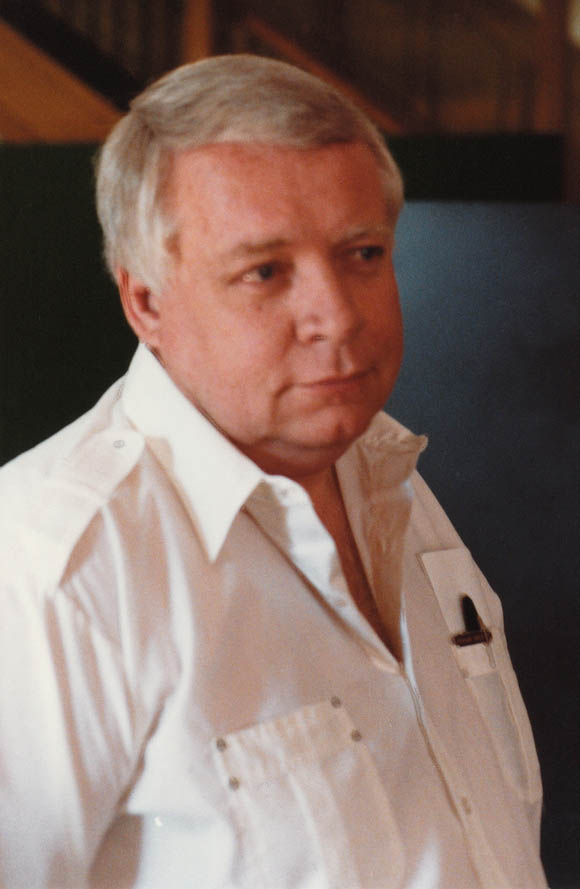
Algis Budrys

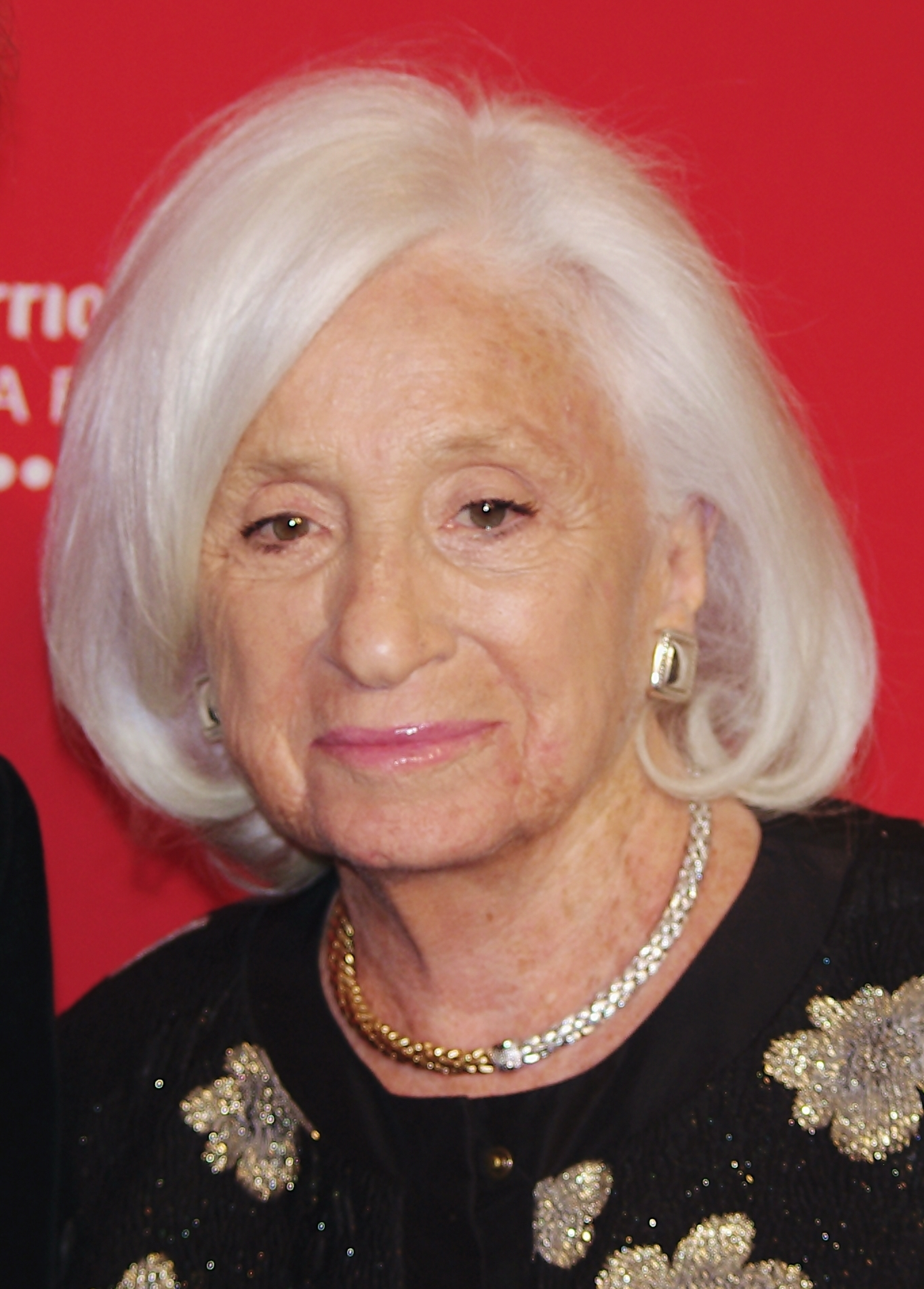
Marion Wiesel

| Alumnus | Notability | Reference |
|---|---|---|
| Algis Budrys | former science fiction writer | |
| Xavier Cortada | eco-artist | |
| Martin J. Dain | American photographer and photojournalist | |
| Patrick Farrell | photojournalist, the Miami Herald, and winner of 2009 Pulitzer Prize for Breaking News Photography | |
| Alex Flinn | author and writer | |
| Jody Houser | Eisner-nominated comics writer | |
| Donald Justice | former writing professor, poet, and winner of 1980 Pulitzer Prize for Poetry | |
| Fiona Kelleghan | science fiction critic | |
| Rhoda Lerman | former author and playwright | |
| Toby Lerner Ansin | founder of Miami City Ballet, co-founder of Sunbeam Television | |
| Mark Medoff | former author, playwright, and Tony Award winner | |
| Arnold Newman | former photographer and 2006 International Photography Hall of Fame and Museum inductee (did not graduate) | |
| Joel Resnicoff | former artist and fashion illustrator (did not graduate) | |
| Adam Sandow | publisher, Metropolis and Worth magazines | |
| Bobuq Sayed | Afghan-Australian writer and poet | |
| James Twitty | abstract painter | |
| Marion Wiesel | Holocaust survivor, former writer, and wife of Nobel Peace Prize recipient Elie Wiesel | |

== Business ==
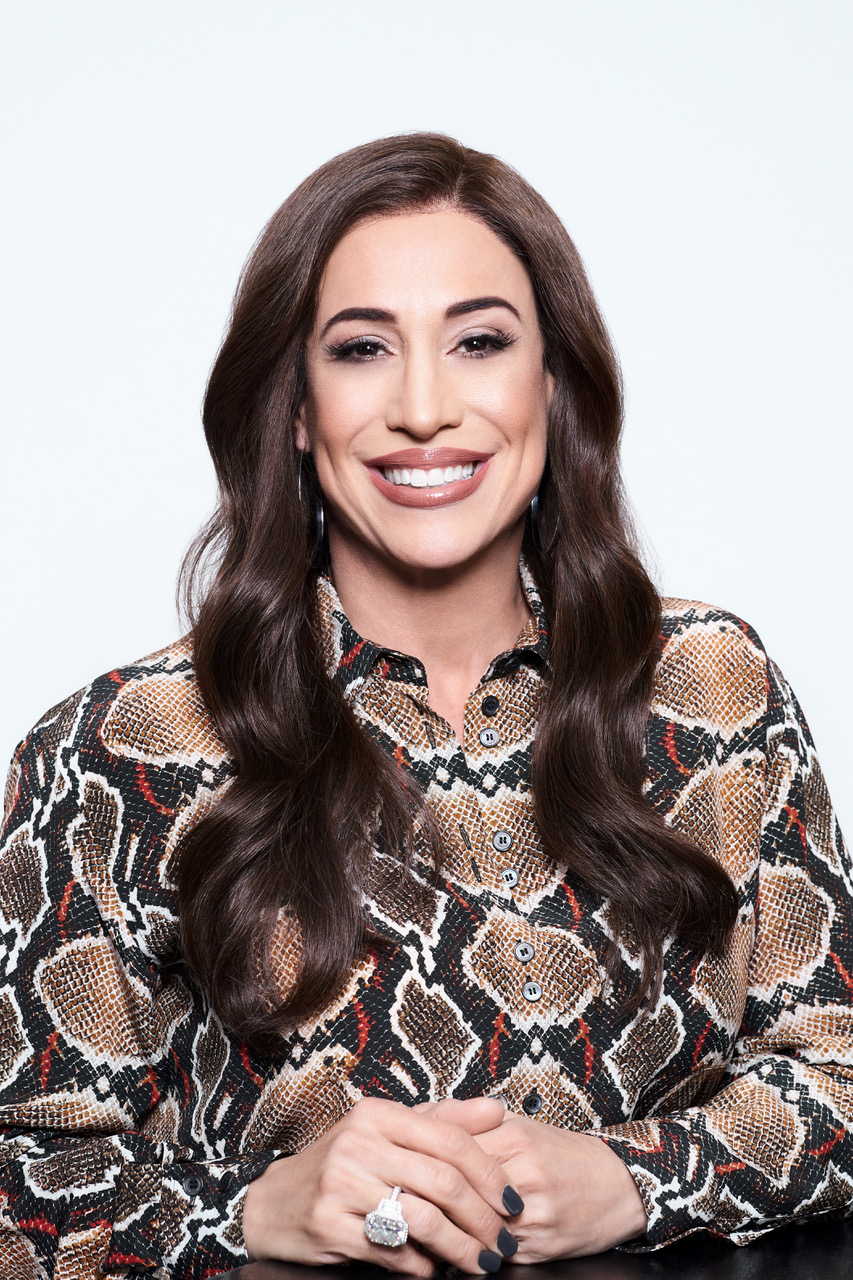
Dany Garcia

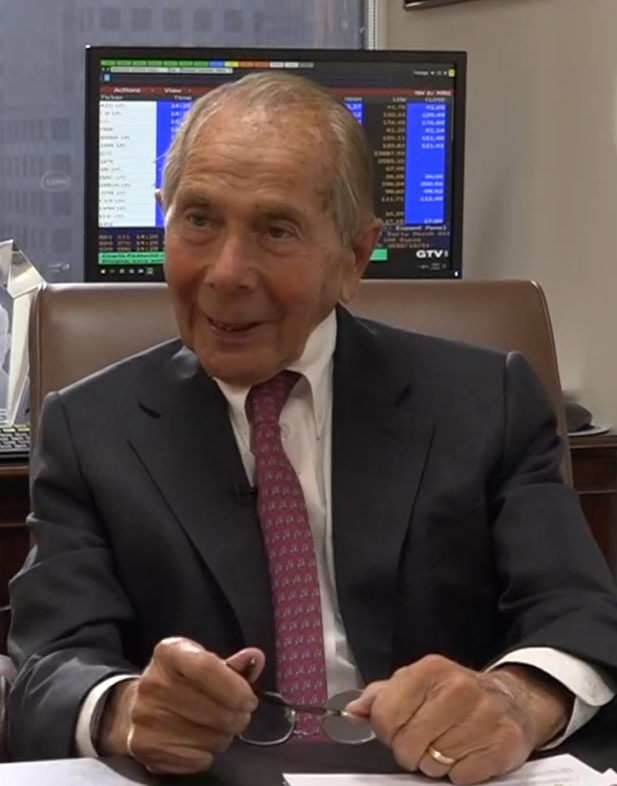
Maurice R. Greenberg

| Alumnus | Notability | Reference |
|---|---|---|
| Rony Abovitz | founder, MAKO Surgical Corp. | |
| Will Allen | urban farmer and MacArthur Foundation's "Genius Award" recipient | |
| Ralph Alvarez | board member, Dunkin' Donuts, and former president and chief operating officer, McDonald's | |
| Micky Arison | billionaire, chairman, and former chief executive officer, Carnival Corporation, and owner of the Miami Heat (did not graduate) | |
| Iqbal Arshad | former executive, Google, Lenovo and senior vice president of engineering-global product development at Motorola | |
| Maria Azua | executive for Fidelity Investments and former Vice President of Advanced Cloud Solutions and Innovation for IBM | |
| Ron Berkowitz | chief executive officer and president, Berk Communications | |
| Bakr bin Laden | former chairman, Saudi Binladin Group, half-brother of Al-Qaeda terrorist Osama bin Laden | |
| Benjamin Breier | board member, Federation of American Hospitals and former chief executive officer and president, Kindred Healthcare | |
| Lyor Cohen | global head of music, Google and YouTube | |
| Wendy Craigg | former governor, Central Bank of The Bahamas | |
| John W. Creighton Jr. | former president and chief executive officer, Weyerhaeuser Company and UAL Corporation | |
| Tomi Davies | founding president of the African Business Angel Network and chief executive officer of TVCLabs | |
| Ghassan Elashi | founder of Holy Land Foundation and former vice president of InfoCom Corporation | |
| Juan Carlos Escotet | billionaire banker, founder of Banesco and Abanca banks; president of Spanish fútbol club Deportivo de La Coruña | |
| José Ferré | businessman, industrialist; known for financing the construction of the New World Tower in Central Business District, Miami | |
| Dany Garcia | former chairwoman, XFL professional football league, film producer, and ex-wife and manager of Dwayne Johnson | |
| James J. Greco | chief executive officer, Tijuana Flats | |
| Maurice R. Greenberg | billionaire, former chief executive officer of American International Group | |
| Jason Haikara | marketing executive, Fox Broadcasting Company | |
| David Komansky | former chief executive officer, Merrill Lynch (did not graduate) | |
| Rohan Marley | co-founder, Marley Coffee, and son of late reggae musician Bob Marley | |
| Jorge Mas | chairman and chief executive officer, MasTec, chairman of Cuban American National Foundation, and managing owner, Inter Miami CF | |
| Tom McAlpin | chairman of Virgin Voyages and former president of Disney Vacation Cruises | |
| Justin Moon | owner of Kahr Arms and co-founder of Rod of Iron Ministries | |
| Matthew Rubel | former president of Collective Brands, Inc. | |
| Ronnie Schneider | former tour manager of the Rolling Stones (1965–1969), former comptroller executive for Virgin Megastores and founder of Association of Concert Bands | |
| David A. Siegel | founder of Westgate Resorts and former owner of the Orlando Predators | |
| Omar Soliman | co-founder, College Hunks Hauling Junk, reality television personality, Millionaire Matchmaker, Shark Tank, and The Pitch | |
| Johnny C. Taylor Jr. | president and chief executive officer, Society for Human Resource Management | |
| Noah Tepperberg | co-chief executive officer, Tao Group Hospitality | |
| Geisha Williams | former chief executive officer, Pacific Gas and Electric Company | |
| Martin Zweig | former investment advisor and author, Winning on Wall Street | |

== Film, television, and theater ==
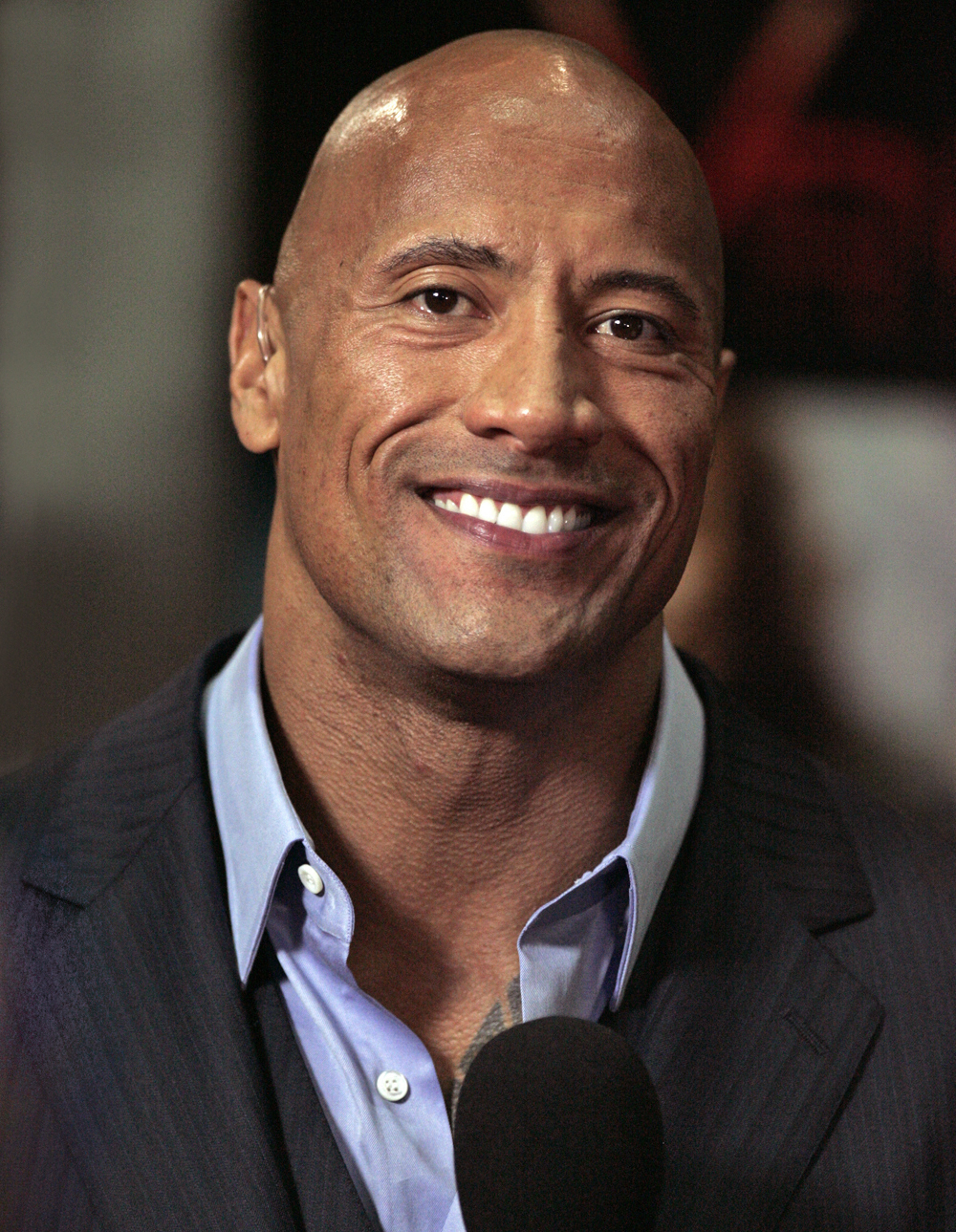
Dwayne "The Rock" Johnson

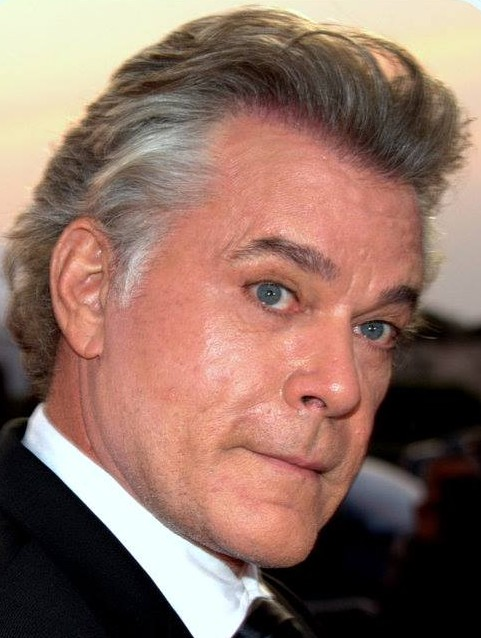
Ray Liotta

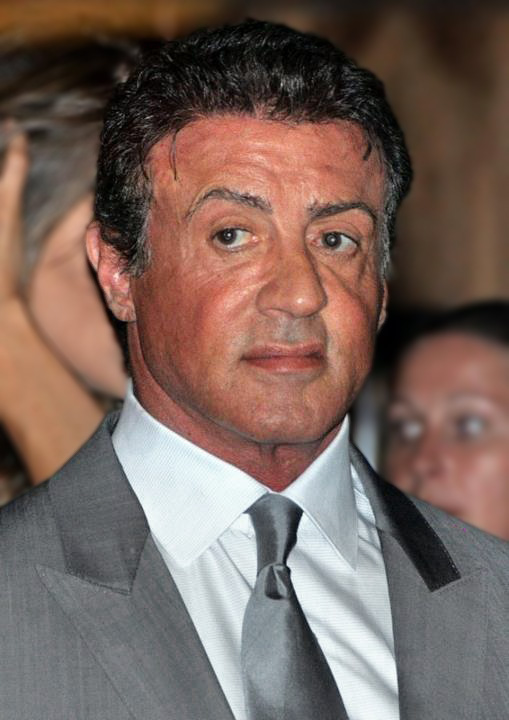
Sylvester Stallone

| Alumnus | Notability | Reference |
|---|---|---|
| Paul Adefarasin | televangelist | |
| Somy Ali | actress, writer, model, and filmmaker | |
| Majel Barrett | former actress who played Nurse Christine Chapel, Number One, computer's voice on Star Trek, Lwaxana Troi on Star Trek: The Next Generation, and Star Trek: Deep Space Nine | |
| Alan Campbell | actor who played Derek Mitchell on Jake and the Fatman and E.Z. Taylor on Three's a Crowd | |
| Bob Clark | former director, A Christmas Story and Porky's | |
| Lewis Cleale | Broadway theatre actor and singer, Sunset Boulevard and Spamalot | |
| Jeff Coopwood | movie and television actor, voice of The Borg in Star Trek: First Contact | |
| Michael Dunn | former actor, Academy Award for Best Supporting Actor nominee for Ship of Fools | |
| Alix Earle | social media personality and actress | |
| Gail Edwards | former actress, It's a Living, Full House, and Blossom | |
| Fahadh Faasil | actor and producer | |
| Alex Ferrer | syndicated television judge, Judge Alex | |
| Jeff Garlin | comedic actor who played Jeff Greene on HBO's Curb Your Enthusiasm and Murray Goldberg on ABC's The Goldbergs (did not graduate) | |
| Galen Gering | actor who plays Rafe Hernandez on Days of Our Lives and Luis Lopez-Fitzgerald on Passions | |
| Robert Greenhut | film producer | |
| Charles Grodin | former actor and former television talk show host (did not graduate) | |
| Joshua Henry | actor and singer, The Scottsboro Boys, Hamilton, Carousel, and Beauty and the Beast: A 30th Celebration | |
| David Isaacs | former producer, Paramount Pictures, and writer, Cheers and Frasier | |
| Jay W. Jensen | former actor, philanthropist, and high school drama teacher to actors Andy García and Mickey Rourke | |
| Dwayne "The Rock" Johnson | actor and WWE professional wrestler | |
| Nancy Kulp | actress who played Miss Jane Hathaway on The Beverly Hillbillies | |
| Max Landis | director, producer, and screenwriter, known for Chronicle, Bright, and Channel Zero | |
| Savanah Leaf | film director and video artist; BAFTA-award-winning film Earth Mama; music video for Gary Clark Jr.'s single "This Land" (Grammy Award nominee for Best Music Video) | |
| Dawnn Lewis | actress who played Jaleesa Vinson-Taylor on A Different World | |
| Ray Liotta | former actor, "Henry Hill" in Goodfellas and Shoeless Joe Jackson in Field of Dreams | |
| Kiel Martin | actor who played J. D. LaRue on Hill Street Blues | |
| Joseph Mascolo | actor who plays Stefano DiMera on Days of Our Lives | |
| Marilyn Milian | judge, The People's Court | |
| Finesse Mitchell | comedian and former repertory performer, Saturday Night Live | |
| Alan Mruvka | film/television producer and screenwriter; co-founded E! Entertainment; Pacific Blue | |
| Josh Rhett Noble | film and voice actor | |
| David Nutter | director, Game of Thrones, and Emmy Award winner | |
| Frank Perry | former director, Mommie Dearest | |
| Jo Ann Pflug | actress, MASH, The Fall Guy, and Operation Petticoat | |
| Gene Roddenberry | producer, writer, and creator of Star Trek: The Original Series (did not graduate) | |
| Ernie Sabella | actor, Chicago, Hill Street Blues, Curtains, and The Lion King | |
| Saundra Santiago | actress who played Det. Gina Navarro Calabrese on Miami Vice | |
| Tessie Santiago | actress who played Tessa Alvarado on Queen of Swords | |
| Cristina Saralegui | Spanish language television personality | |
| Alberto Sardiñas | television host | |
| Gianmarco Soresi | stand-up comedian, podcast host, political activist | |
| Sylvester Stallone | actor, Rocky Balboa in Rocky (degree granted in 1998) | |
| Patti Stanger | reality television producer and personality, The Millionaire Matchmaker | |
| Steve-O | comedic actor, Jackass (did not graduate) | |

== Government and politics ==
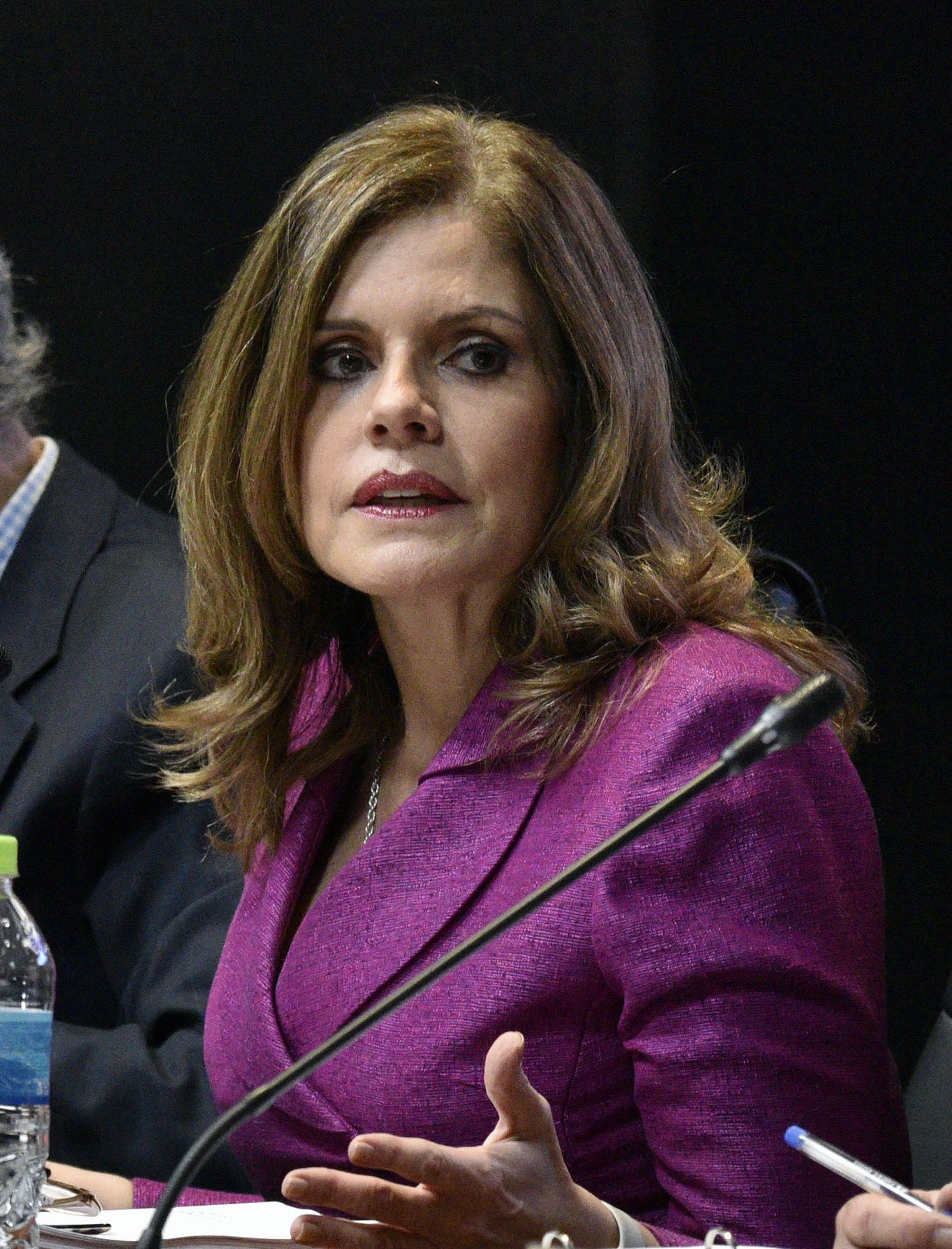
Mercedes Aráoz

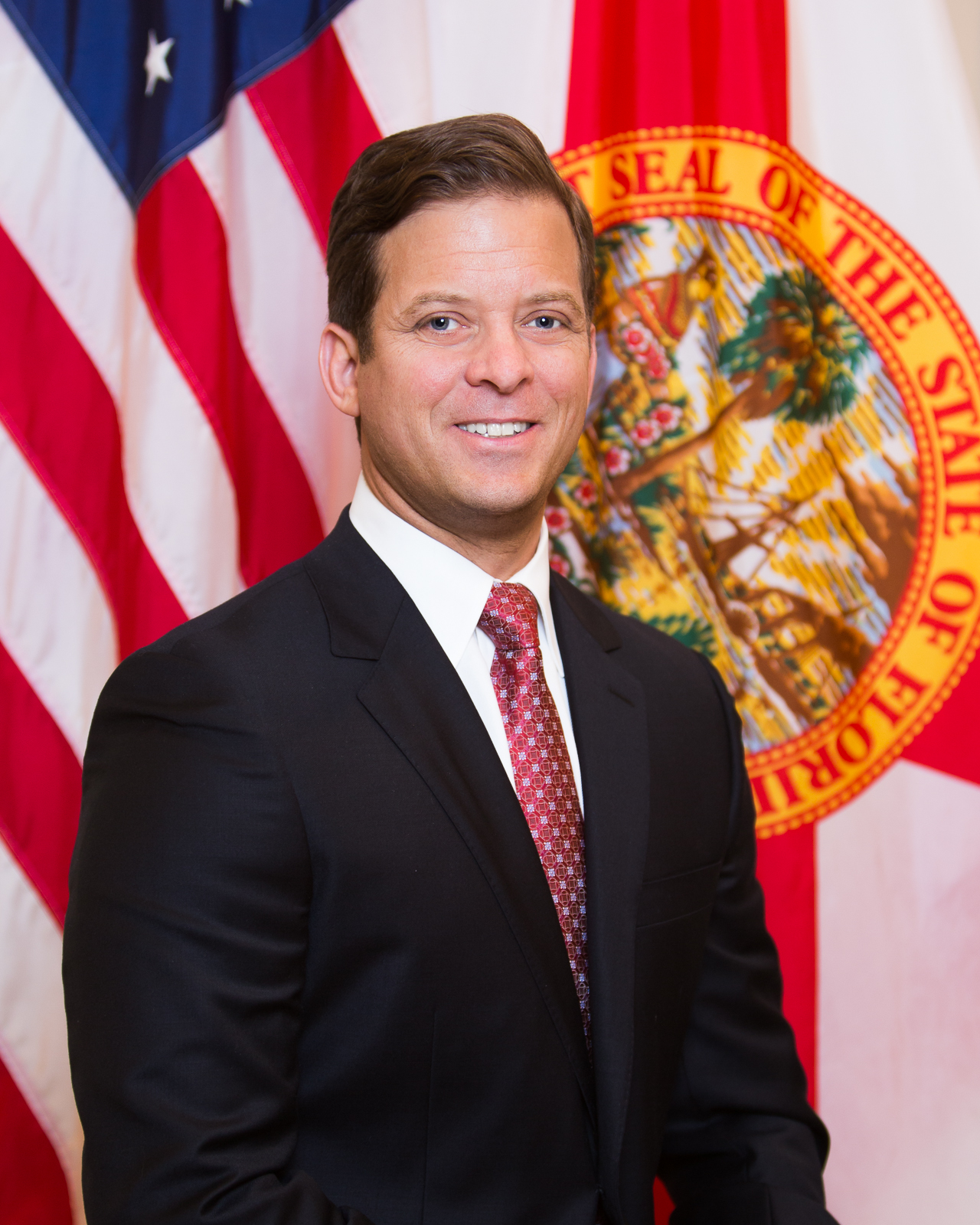
Carlos Lopez-Cantera

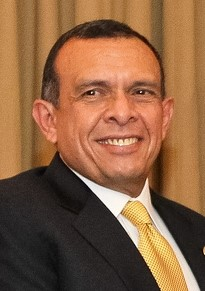
Pepe Lobo

| Alumnus | Notability | Reference |
|---|---|---|
| Raed Abu Soud | former minister of Transportation, Jordan | |
| Michael M. Adler | former U.S. ambassador to Belgium | |
| Vance Aloupis | former member, Florida House of Representatives | |
| Danny Alvarez | member, Florida House of Representatives | |
| Robert A. Anderson | former member, Minnesota House of Representatives | |
| Mercedes Aráoz | former vice president of Peru and former prime minister of Peru | |
| Abdul Rahman bin Hamad Al Attiyah | fourth secretary general, Gulf Cooperation Council | |
| Bryan Avila | member, Florida House of Representatives | |
| Dean Barrow | former prime minister, Belize | |
| Alan S. Becker | former member, Minnesota House of Representatives | |
| Fernando Belaúnde | former president of Peru (did not graduate) | |
| Bjarni Benediktsson | former prime minister of Iceland | |
| Samuel Bonasso | former deputy acting administrator of the Research and Special Programs Administration, U.S. Department of Transportation | |
| G. Holmes Braddock | former member, Miami-Dade County Public School Board | |
| Jovita Carranza | 26th administrator of the Small Business Administration and 44th treasurer of the United States | |
| Paul L. Cejas | former U.S. ambassador to Belgium | |
| Randy Christmas | former mayor of Miami | |
| Joe Ciresi | member, Pennsylvania House of Representatives | |
| Wendy Craigg | former governor, Central Bank of the Bahamas | |
| Carlos Curbelo | former U.S. representative | |
| Victor De Yurre | former member of the Miami City Commission | |
| Manny Diaz | former chairman, Florida Democratic Party, and former mayor, Miami | |
| Alex Díaz de la Portilla | former member of the Florida Senate, former member of the Miami City Commission | |
| Dante Fascell | former U.S. representative and chairman of House Foreign Affairs Committee | |
| Maurice Ferré | former mayor, Miami | |
| Sandra Freedman | former mayor, Tampa, Florida | |
| Joe Garcia | lobbyist and former U.S. representative | |
| René García | former member, Florida Senate | |
| Genaro García Luna | former secretary of Public Security of Mexico and director of the Federal Investigative Agency | |
| Denise Grimsley | former member, Florida Senate | |
| Alberto Gutman | former member, Florida Senate | |
| Robert High | former mayor, Miami | |
| Michael Johns | former White House presidential speechwriter and healthcare executive | |
| Dexter Lehtinen | former member, Florida Senate | |
| Francis Liang | Taiwan Representative to Singapore and former Deputy Minister of Economic Affairs, Taiwan | |
| Pepe Lobo | former president of Honduras | |
| Carlos López-Cantera | former lieutenant governor of Florida | |
| Bob McEwen | former U.S. representative | |
| Asot Michael | former Minister of Tourism, Economic Development Investment and Energy, Parliament of Antigua and Barbuda | |
| Martha Mitchell | Watergate scandal political figure and wife of Nixon administration U.S. Attorney General John N. Mitchell | |
| Joe Moakley | former U.S. representative | |
| Rubén Darío Lizarralde Montoya | 12th Minister of Agriculture and Rural Development of Colombia | |
| Patrick Murphy | former U.S. representative | |
| Richard C. Nowakowski | former member, Wisconsin State Assembly | |
| Burgess Owens | U.S. representative and former professional football player, New York Jets and Los Angeles Raiders | |
| Lynne Patton | White House director of Minority Outreach | |
| Alex Penelas | former mayor, Miami-Dade County, Florida | |
| Walid Phares | scholar and political pundit | |
| Tomás Regalado | former mayor, Miami | |
| Tom Rooney | former U.S. representative | |
| Ileana Ros-Lehtinen | lobbyist and former U.S. representative | |
| Joseph Saaka | member, National Democratic Congress in Ghana | |
| María Elvira Salazar | U.S. representative | |
| Burt Saunders | former member, Florida Senate | |
| Paul B. Steinberg | former member, Florida Senate | |
| Richard L. Steinberg | former member, Florida House of Representatives | |
| Grant Stockdale | former U.S. ambassador to Ireland | |
| Alex Villalobos | former member, Florida State Senate | |
| Kirk Wagar | former U.S. ambassador to Singapore | |
| Richard H. Wasai | former member, Hawaii House of Representatives | |
| Frederica Wilson | former U.S. representative | |

== Journalism ==
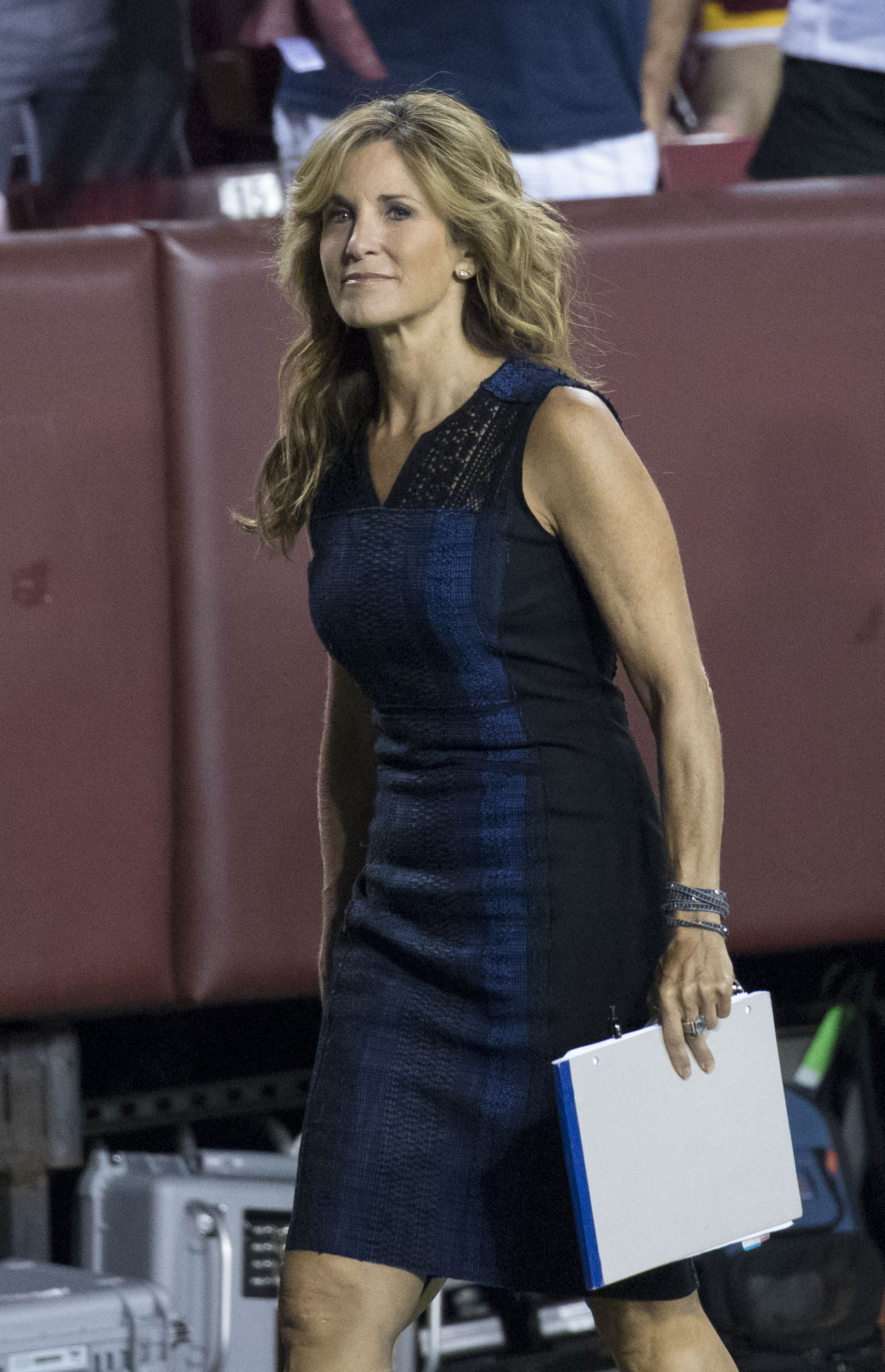
Suzy Kolber

| Alumnus | Notability | Reference |
|---|---|---|
| Louis Aguirre | news anchor currently at WPLG hosting Local 10 World News abd former anchor The Insider | |
| Jill Arrington | former college football sideline reporter, ESPN | |
| Jamie Colby | anchor and correspondent, Fox News Live | |
| Roy Firestone | sports journalist, HDNet, and seven-time Emmy Award winner | |
| Pedro Gomez | former baseball reporter, ESPN | |
| Herb Greenberg | former business journalist and commentator, CNBC | |
| Jason Kennedy | entertainment journalist and host, E! News and Live from E! and contributor to Today Show | |
| Suzy Kolber | professional football sideline reporter, co-producer, and sportscaster, ESPN and ESPN2 | |
| Dan Le Batard | sports journalist, Miami Herald and ESPN | |
| Lilia Luciano | national correspondent, CBS News | |
| Javier Morgado | executive producer, CNN and NBC News | |
| Ana Navarro | political contributor, CNN, and campaign consultant | |
| Jackie Nespral | news anchor, NBC affiliate WTVJ in Miami | |
| Jorge Ramos | news anchor, Noticiero Univision, and eight-time Emmy Award winner | |
| Ralph Renick | news anchor, CBS affiliate WFOR-TV in Miami, and two-time Emmy Award winner | |
| Eliott Rodriguez | news anchor, CBS affiliate WFOR in Miami, and two-time Emmy Award winner | |
| Jacki Schechner | news anchor, former CNN and Current TV news correspondent | |
| Manuel Teodoro | journalist editorial assistant for CBS News and former correspondent for CNN | |
| Allison Williams | sportscaster reporter with Fox Sports | |

== Law ==
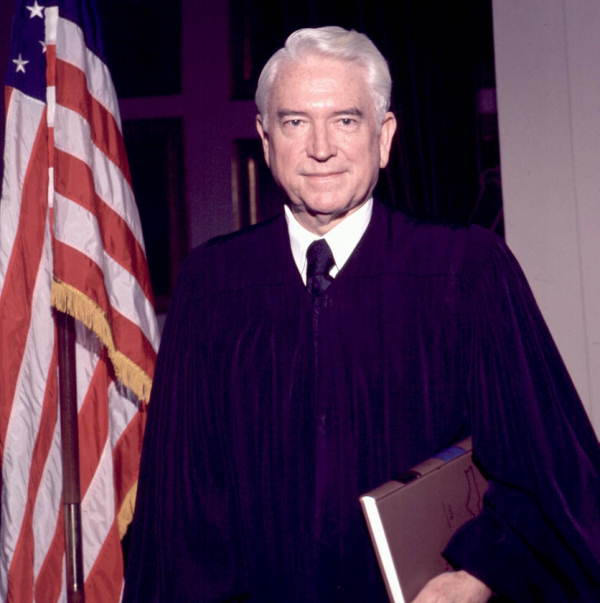
Joseph A. Boyd Jr.

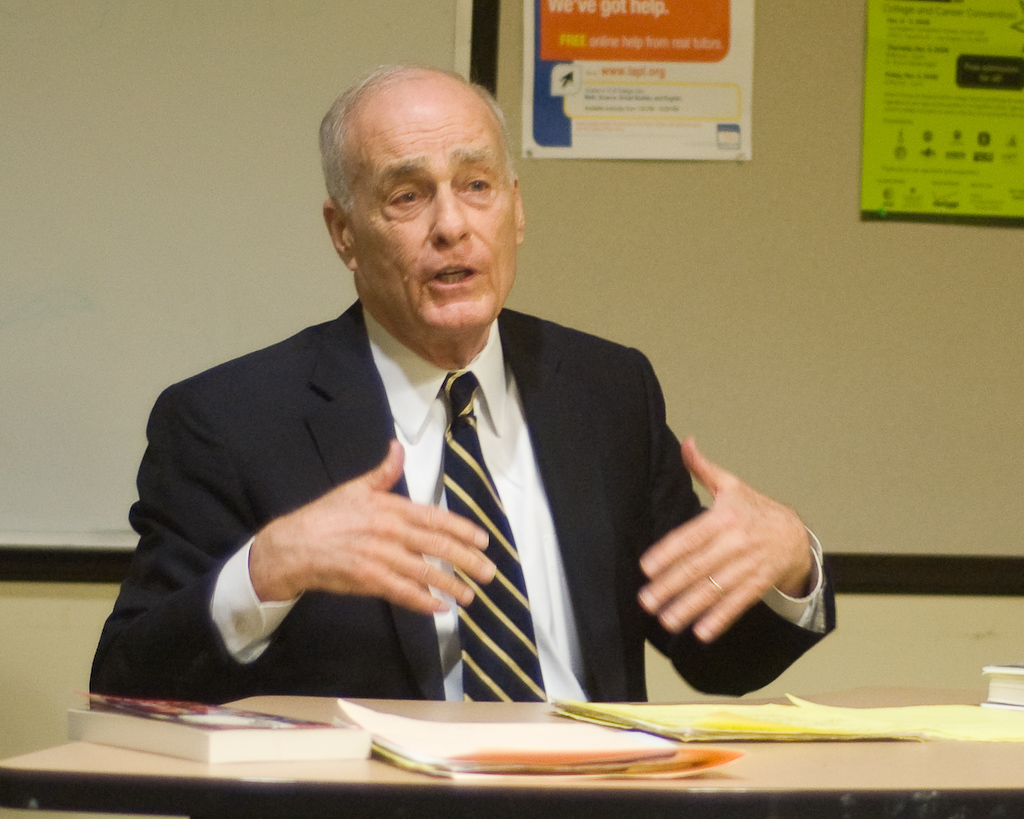
Vincent Bugliosi

| Alumnus | Notability | Reference |
|---|---|---|
| Jorge Alonso | judge of the United States District Court for the Northern District of Illinois | |
| Frank Angones | head of The Florida Bar and president of the Cuban-American Bar Association | |
| Tamara Ashford | judge of the United States Tax Court and Tax Division under Barack Obama | |
| Roy Black | criminal defense attorney, obtained criminal acquittal of William Kennedy Smith | |
| Beth Bloom | judge of United States District Court for the Southern District of Florida | |
| Joseph A. Boyd Jr. | former chief justice, Florida Supreme Court | |
| Vincent Bugliosi | former prosecutor who obtained criminal conviction of Charles Manson and author, Helter Skelter | |
| Richard W. Goldberg | former U.S. senior judge of the United States Court of International Trade | |
| Alan Hochberg | lawyer and 1973 Democratic primary candidate, borough president of the Bronx | |
| Adalberto Jordan | appellate judge, United States Court of Appeals for the Eleventh Circuit | |
| Elizabeth A. Kovachevich | senior U.S. district court judge, Middle District of Florida | |
| Jose E. Martinez | U.S. district court judge, Southern District of Florida | |
| Ryan Pinder | lawyer and former minister for Legal Affairs and attorney-general the Bahamas | |
| Scott J. Silverman | former circuit court judge, 11th Circuit Court of Florida (did not graduate) | |
| Robert H. Traurig | lawyer, businessman, and founder of Greenberg Traurig law and lobbying firm | |
| Ursula Mancusi Ungaro | former U.S. district court judge for Southern District of Florida | |

== Military ==
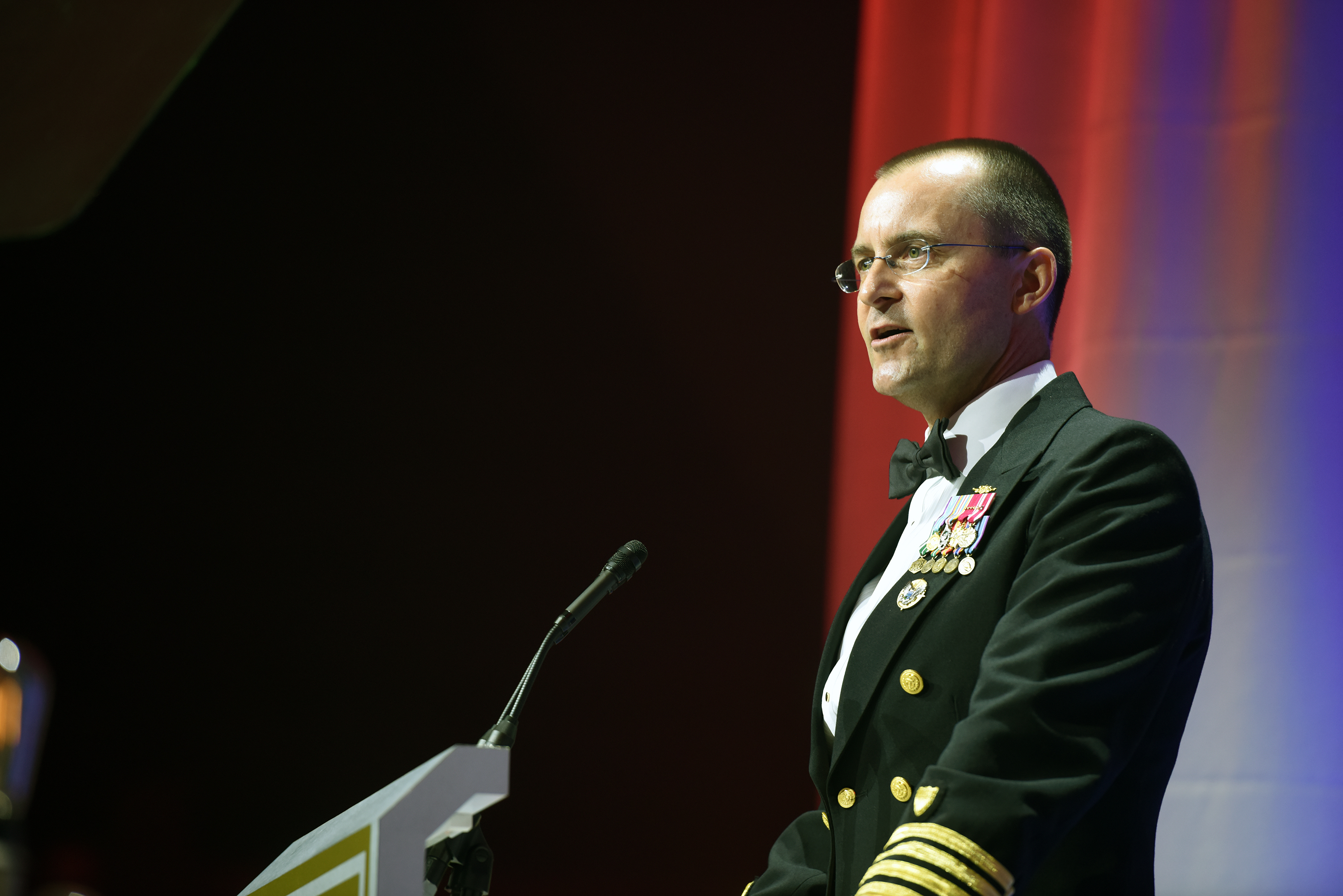
Charles D. Michel

| Alumnus | Notability | Reference |
|---|---|---|
| James Bradshaw Adamson | U.S. Army major general, former commander of Military District of Washington, which involved coordinating the military with the White House | |
| Charles Donald Albury | U.S. Army Air Forces captain, pilot for the atomic bombings of Hiroshima and Nagasaki leading to Japan's unconditional surrender, ending World War II | |
| William C. Anderson | former U.S. assistant secretary of the Air Force (Installations, Environment and Logistics) | |
| William E. Cooper | U.S. Army major general, last served as the deputy director for foreign intelligence at the Defense Intelligence Agency | |
| James W. Crawford III | U.S. Navy vice admiral, last served as the 43rd Judge Advocate General | |
| Eric Golnick | veteran of the U.S. Navy and an advocate for mental healthcare among military veterans | |
| Thomas Harker | former acting United States secretary of the Navy and under secretary of defense (comptroller) under President Joe Biden; former U.S. Coast Guard commander | |
| Beverly Kelley | U.S. Coast Guard captain, first woman to command a U.S. military vessel | |
| Charles D. Michel | U.S. Coast Guard admiral, last served as the 30th vice commandant of the Coast Guard | |
| Rudy Moise | U.S. Air Force colonel, awarded the Presidential Lifetime Achievement Award from President Joe Biden | |
| Steven M. Rainey | U.S. Air Force lieutenant colonel, famed test pilot and former commander of 411th Flight Test Squadron; first USAF pilot to fly the F-22 aircraft, and the first pilot to fly cross-country in the F-22 | |
| Frederick E. Vollrath | U.S. Army lieutenant general, first assistant secretary of Defense for Readiness and Force Management and former deputy chief of staff personnel of U.S. Army | |

== Music ==
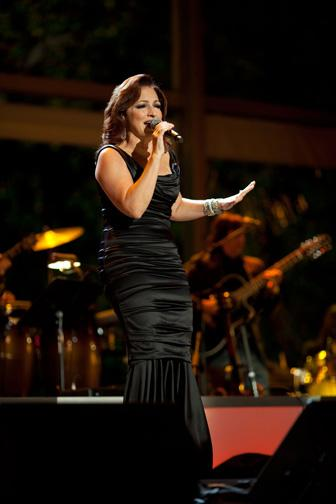
Gloria Estefan

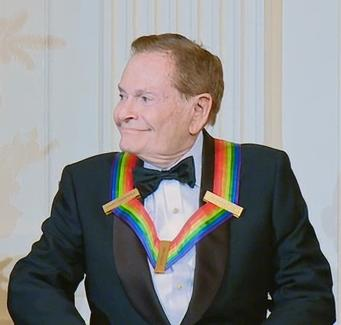
Jerry Herman

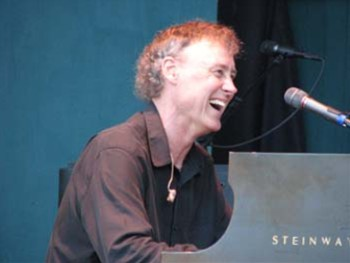
Bruce Hornsby

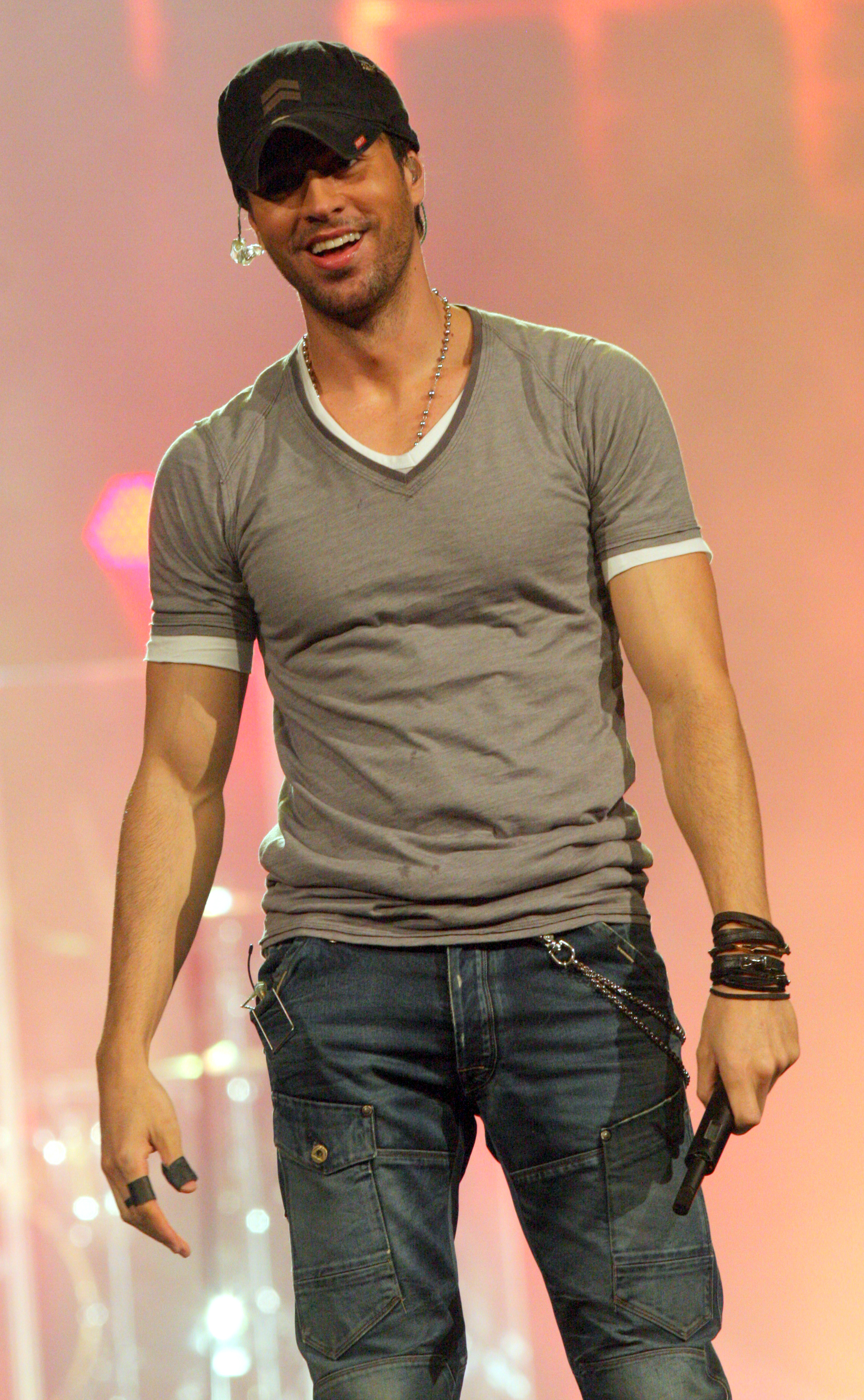
Enrique Iglesias

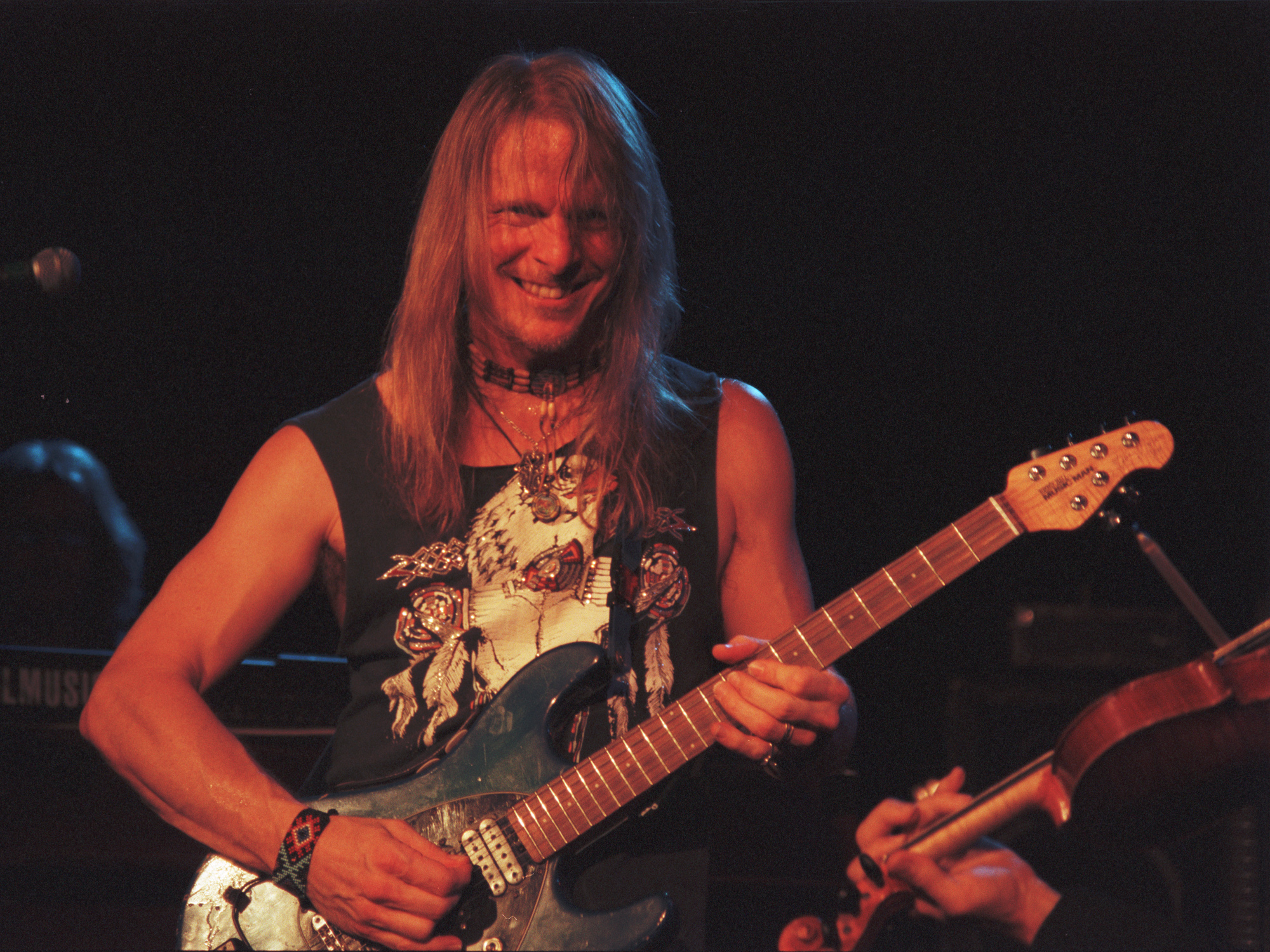
Steve Morse

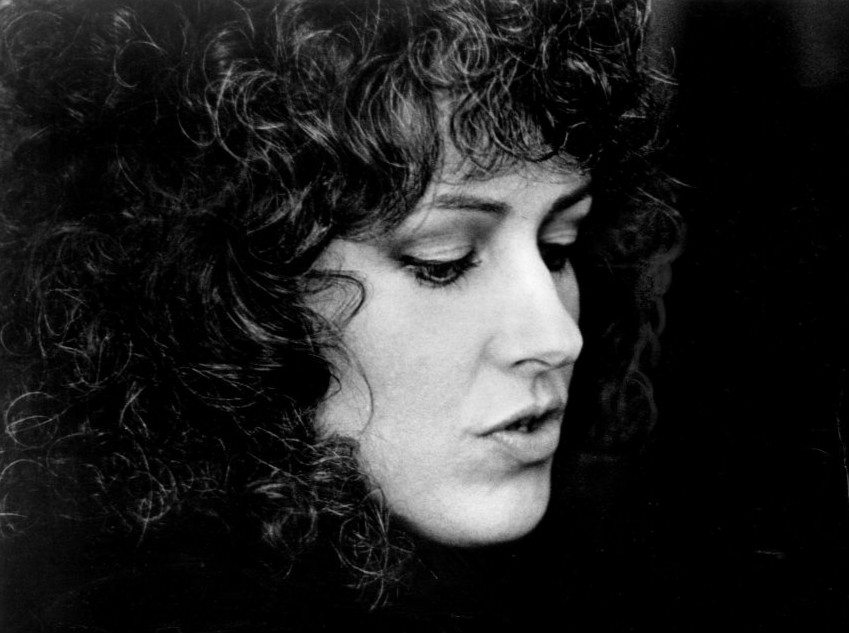
Grace Slick

| Alumnus | Notability | Reference |
|---|---|---|
| Michelle Amato | vocalist | |
| Julio Bagué | producer and arranger; Latin Grammy Award winner | |
| Bart Baker | parody artist | |
| Brian Balmages | composer and conductor | |
| Jeffri W. Bantz | former classical conductor, pianist, and organist | |
| Monika Borzym | singer | |
| Anthony Branker | musician | |
| Elizabeth Caballero | operatic soprano | |
| Debbie Cameron | singer | |
| Tim Cashion | current keyboardist, Grand Funk Railroad | |
| Jamie Christopherson | video game music and film composer; known for the movie The Crow: Wicked Prayer and games Metal Gear Rising: Revengeance and Lord of the Rings: The Battle For Middle-Earth | |
| Sylvia Constantinidis | classical pianist, composer, conductor, and music educator | |
| Douglas Cuomo | television composer | |
| Ann Curless | lead singer and songwriter, Exposé | |
| John Easterlin | opera singer | |
| Mark Egan | jazz bassist, Pat Metheny Group | |
| Gloria Estefan | singer, eight-time Grammy Award winner, Presidential Medal of Freedom recipient, 100 million worldwide record sales making her one of the best-selling music artists of all time | |
| Ben Folds | pianist and former member, Ben Folds Five (did not graduate) | |
| Kenneth Fuchs | composer; Grammy Award winner | |
| Orlando Jacinto García | composer | |
| Natalie Gelman | singer and songwriter | |
| Carlo Grante | concert pianist and scholar | |
| Euge Groove | smooth jazz musician | |
| Sydney Guillaume | film composer and conductor | |
| Jerry Herman | composer and lyricist, Hello Dolly! and La Cage aux Folles and two-time Tony Award winner | |
| Dorothy Hindman | composer and music educator | |
| Bruce Hornsby | jazz musician and three-time Grammy Award winner | |
| Idarose | singer, songwriter and producer; songwriter for horror movie Smile 2, has written songs for Naomi Scott, Joji, Twice, and Brett Eldredge | |
| Enrique Iglesias | singer, songwriter, and Grammy Award winner (did not graduate) | |
| Juhani Komulainen | composer | |
| Jonathan Kreisberg | jazz guitarist and composer | |
| Larry Lake | composer, trumpeter, radio broadcaster, and record producer | |
| C Lanzbom | guitarist and songwriter, and co-founder of Soulfarm with Noah Chase | |
| Amy Lee | saxophonist and former member for Jimmy Buffett's Coral Reefer Band | |
| Will Lee | bassist and band member, Late Show with David Letterman | |
| Carmen Lundy | jazz musician | |
| Marvis Martin | opera singer | |
| Madame Mayhem | singer and songwriter | |
| Joel McNeely | composer | |
| Johanna Meier | opera singer | |
| Pat Metheny | jazz guitarist and founder of Pat Metheny Group (did not graduate) | |
| Mladen Milicevic | film composer; Emmy-nominated | |
| Pete Minger | bebop jazz musician | |
| Silvano Monasterios | pianist, composer and orchestrator | |
| Tom Moon | saxophonist and music critic | |
| Steve Morse | rock guitarist, Dixie Dregs, Deep Purple, and Kansas; seven-time Grammy nominee | |
| George Noriega | songwriter and record producer; Grammy-winning and Emmy-nominated | |
| Erin O'Donnell | contemporary Christian musician | |
| Jaco Pastorius | jazz bassist and two-time Grammy Award nominee (did not graduate) | |
| Brianna Perry (also known as Lil' Brianna) | rapper and singer | |
| Robert Phillips | classical guitarist | |
| Samuel Pilafian | music educator | |
| Lucas Prata | house music singer and songwriter | |
| André Raphel | classical conductor | |
| Carole Dawn Reinhart | trumpet player and professor | |
| Kerrie Roberts | contemporary Christian musician | |
| Steve Rucker | former drummer, Bee Gees | |
| Cécile McLorin Salvant | jazz vocalist | |
| Maria Schneider | jazz musician and composer | |
| Patti Scialfa | singer and guitarist, E Street Band, wife of rock musician Bruce Springsteen (did not graduate) | |
| Jon Secada | singer, songwriter, two-time Grammy Award winner | |
| James T. Slater | singer and songwriter, two-time Grammy nominee | |
| Grace Slick | singer and songwriter, The Great Society, Jefferson Airplane, Jefferson Starship, and Starship (did not graduate) | |
| John Splithoff | musician | |
| Jason Sutter | drummer for Smash Mouth, Foreigner, and Ben Lee | |
| Andy Timmons | blues and rock guitar player | |
| Ed Toth | drummer, Doobie Brothers | |
| James Touchi-Peters | classical conductor, composer, and jazz singer | |
| Carter Vail | indie rock and comedy musician | |
| Anaís Vivas | singer | |
| Willie Anthony Waters | first African-American to become artistic director of a major opera company | |
| Constance Weldon | tuba pioneer | |
| Colin Welford | conductor; music supervisor and producer of several Broadway productions including Disney's The Lion King, Wicked and Billy Elliot | |
| Lari White | country music singer and songwriter | |
| Al G. Wright | former band director for Purdue All-American Marching Band | |
| Yisel | singer and producer | |
| Zoe Zeniodi | conductor and pianist | |

== Science, technology, medicine, and engineering ==
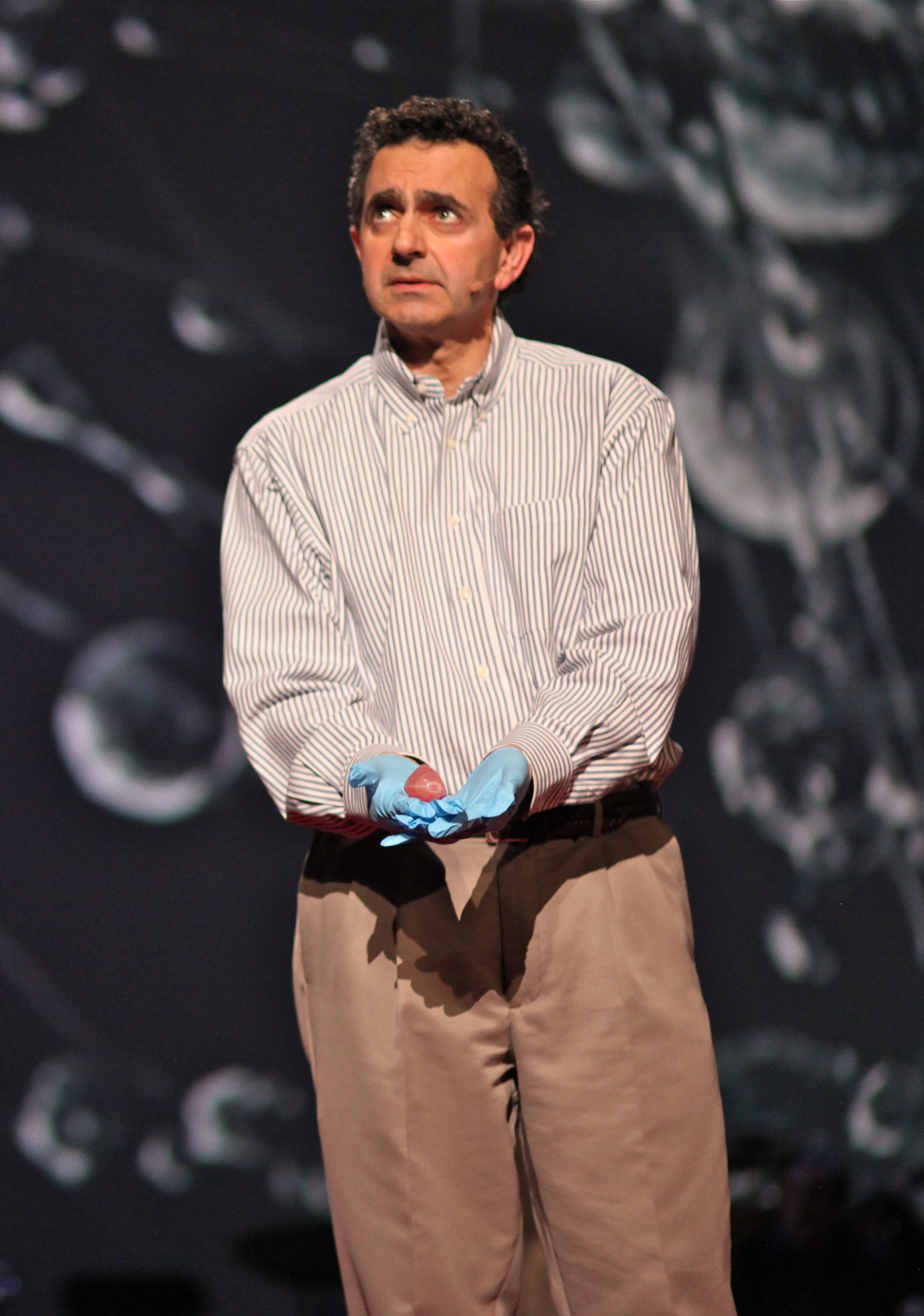
Anthony Atala

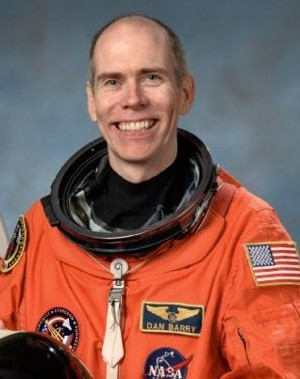
Daniel Barry

| Alumnus | Notability | Reference |
|---|---|---|
| Maria Abreu | gastroenterologist, inducted into the American Society for Clinical Investigation and Association of American Physicians | |
| Anthony Atala | bioengineer, urologist, and pediatric surgeon; founding director of the Wake Forest Institute for Regenerative Medicine | |
| Brady Barr | herpetologist and host, Nat Geo Wild's Reptile Wild and Dangerous Encounters with Brady Barr | |
| Daniel Barry | NASA astronaut | |
| Frederick Bayer | former biologist and former curator emeritus, Smithsonian Institution's National Museum of Natural History | |
| Renee Borges | biologist | |
| Venetia Briggs-Gonzalez | Belizean wildlife research ecologist | |
| Alizé Carrère | climatologist, filmmaker, and National Geographic Young Explorer adventurer | |
| John E. Dennis | mathematician, Society for Industrial and Applied Mathematics fellow, and founder and editor-in-chief, SIAM Journal on Optimization | |
| Steven Falcone | physician and medical academic, Miller School of Medicine at the University of Miami | |
| Gloria Hemingway | physician and writer | |
| Glenn Laffel | physician and health IT expert, senior vice president of clinical affairs for Practice Fusion | |
| Reuben Lasker | former marine biologist | |
| Michelle Mainelli | deputy director, National Weather Service | |
| David Perlmutter | celebrity doctor | |
| Eliseo J. Pérez-Stable | physician-scientist, director of the National Institute on Minority Health and Health Disparities | |
| Ed Roberts | engineer, inventor and medical doctor; invented the first commercially successful microcomputer and is often "the father of the personal computer" (PC) | |
| Aldemaro Romero Jr. | biologist, communicator, and education activist | |
| Joel Salinas | neurologist, author and scientist. Chief Medical Officer and co-founder of Isaac Health | |
| Michael Welner | forensic psychiatrist | |
| Paul Alan Wetter | surgeon and surgical pioneer, noted for significant advances in minimally invasive and robotic surgery | |
| Zhou Mingzhen | former paleontologist | |

== Sports ==
=== Baseball ===
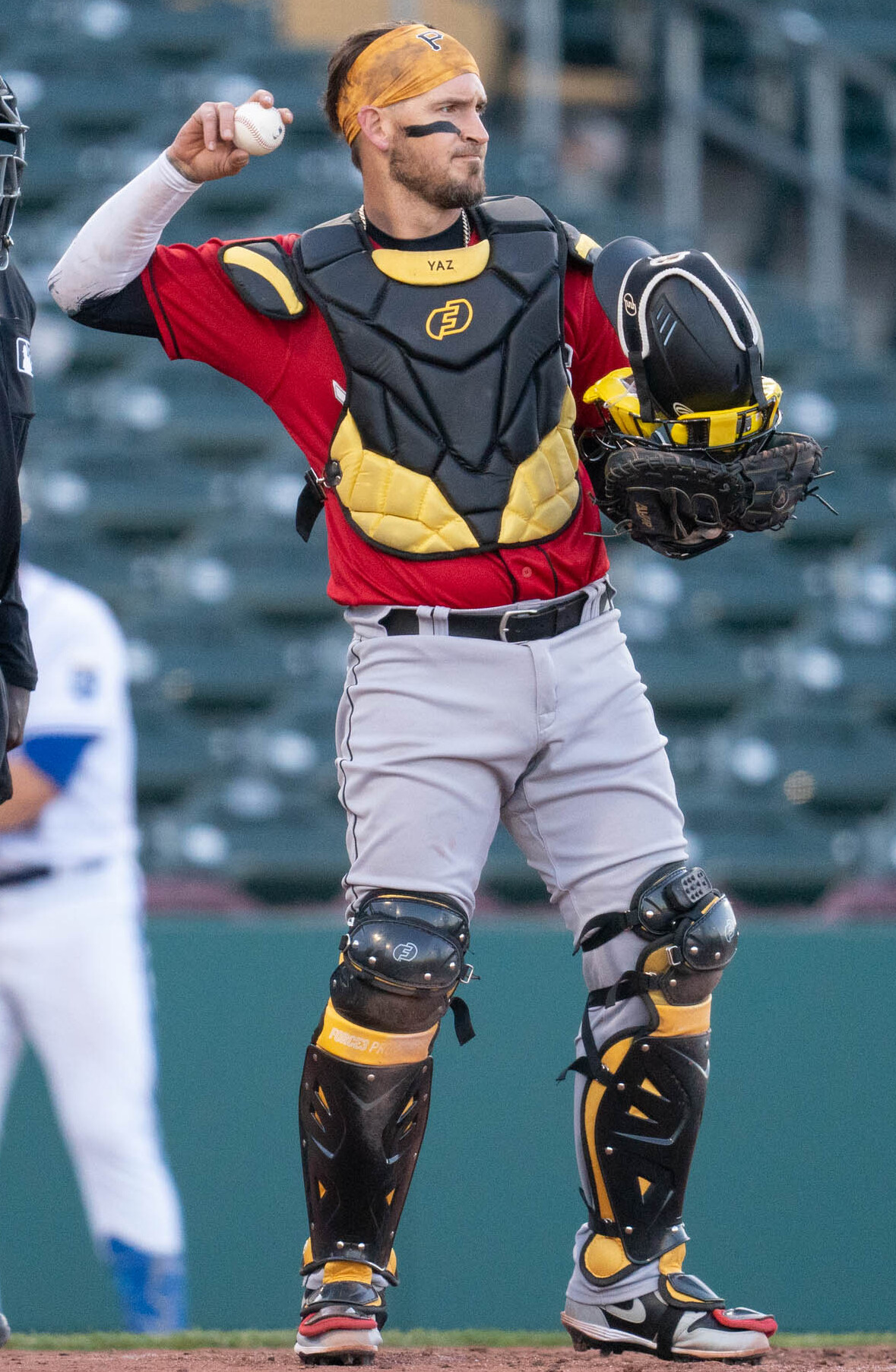
Yasmani Grandal

==== Current MLB players ====
| Alumnus | Notability | Reference |
|---|---|---|
| Slade Cecconi | pitcher, Cleveland Guardians | |
| Adrian Del Castillo | catcher, Arizona Diamondbacks | |
| Yasmani Grandal | free agent catcher and first baseman | |
| Alex McFarlane | pitcher, Philadelphia Phillies | |
| Víctor Mederos | pitcher, Atlanta Braves | |
| Peter O'Brien | free agent left fielder | |
| Andrew Suárez | free agent pitcher | |

==== Current international players ====
| Alumnus | Notability | Reference |
|---|---|---|
| Bryan Garcia | free agent pitcher | |
| Danny Valencia | third baseman, Israel national baseball team | |

==== Former MLB players ====
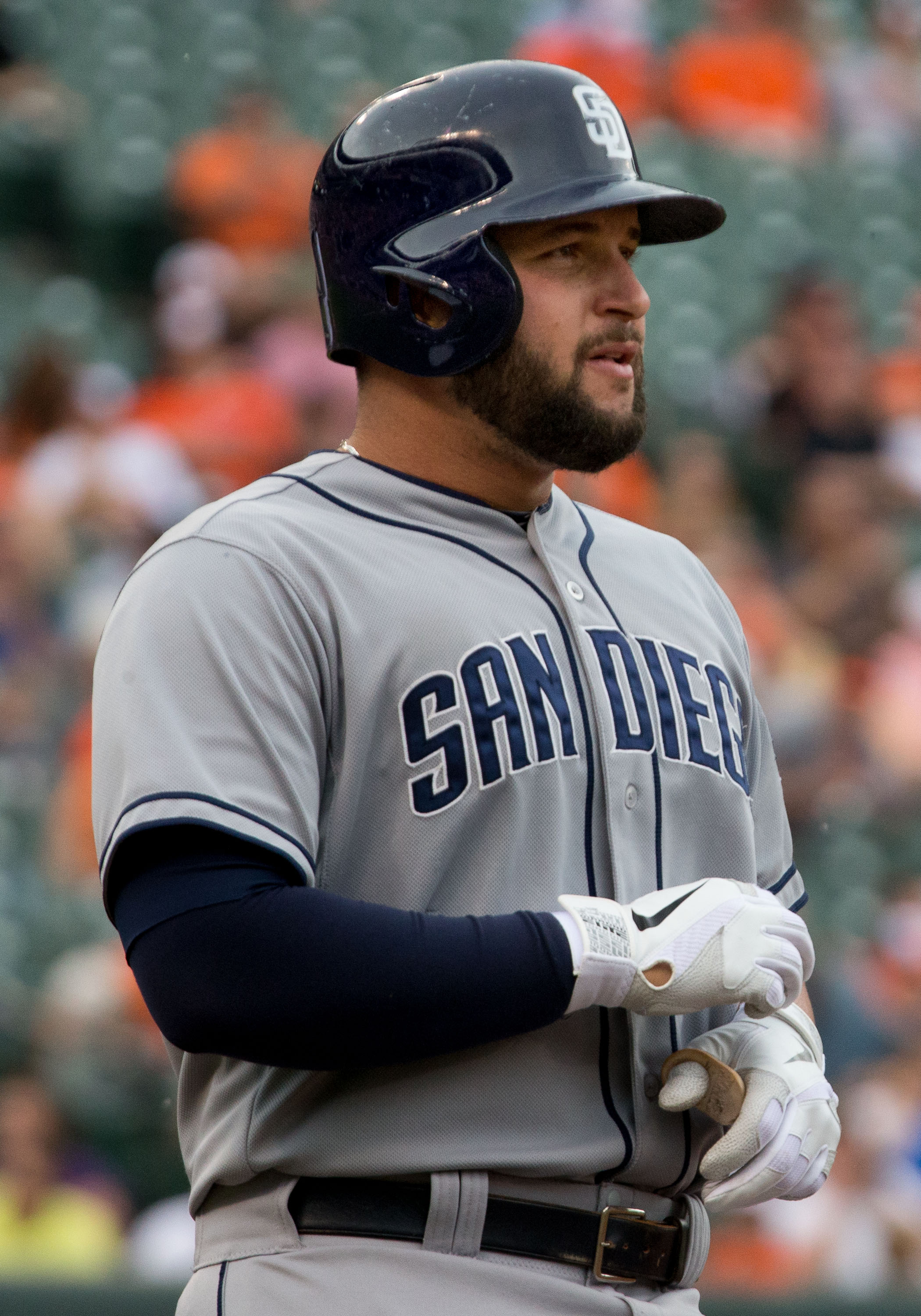
Yonder Alonso

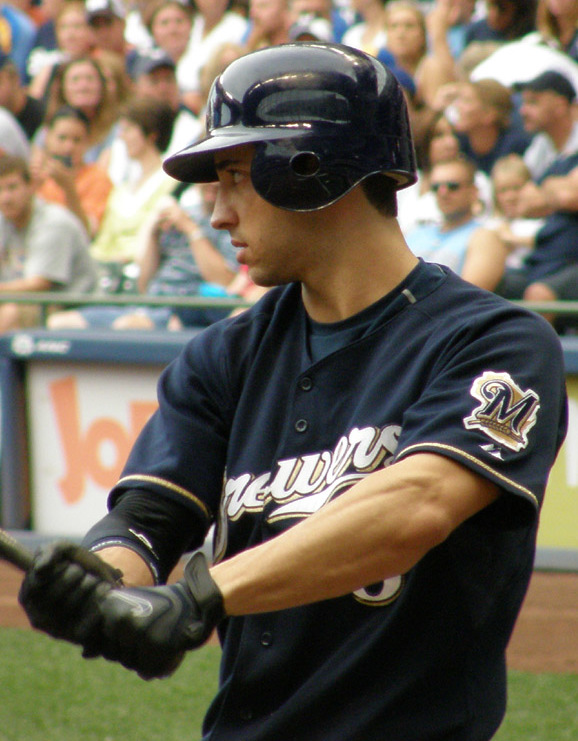
Ryan Braun

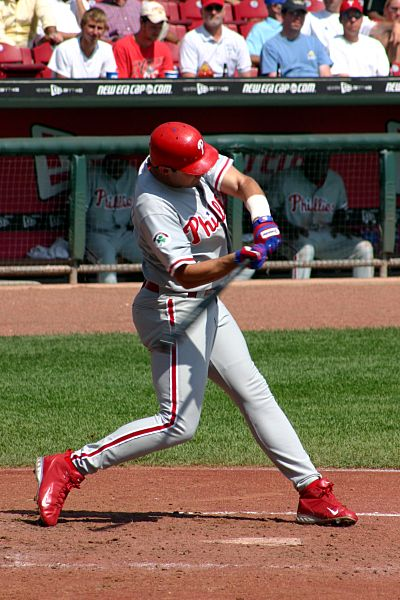
Pat Burrell

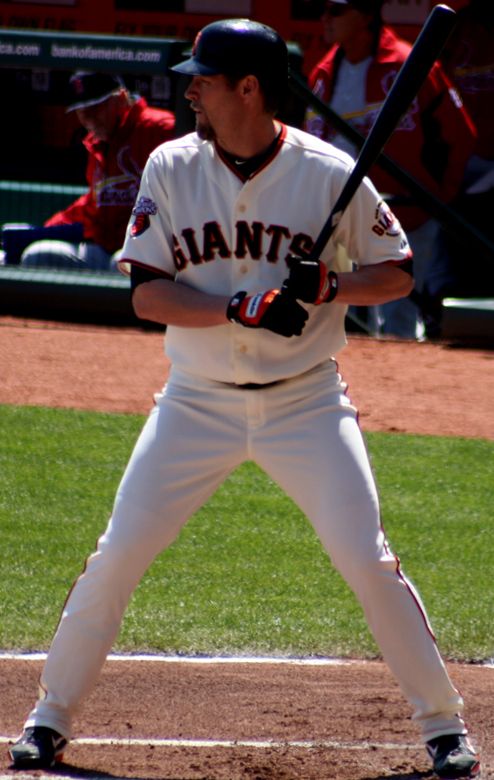
Aubrey Huff

| Alumnus | Notability | Reference |
|---|---|---|
| Yonder Alonso | former first baseman, Atlanta Braves, Chicago White Sox, Cincinnati Reds, Cleveland Indians, Colorado Rockies, Oakland Athletics, San Diego Padres, and Seattle Mariners | |
| Mike Armstrong | former pitcher, Cleveland Indians, Kansas City Royals, New York Yankees, and San Diego Padres | |
| Dave Berg | former infielder, Florida Marlins and Toronto Blue Jays | |
| Ryan Braun | former outfielder, Milwaukee Brewers (did not graduate) | |
| Pat Burrell | former left fielder, Philadelphia Phillies, San Francisco Giants, and Tampa Bay Rays | |
| Cesar Carillo | former pitcher, San Diego Padres | |
| Zack Collins | former catcher and designated hitter, Chicago White Sox, Cleveland Guardians, Pittsburgh Pirates, and Toronto Blue Jays | |
| Jorge Fábregas | former catcher, Arizona Diamondbacks, Atlanta Braves, California Angels, Chicago White Sox, Florida Marlins, Kansas City Royals, Milwaukee Brewers, and New York Mets | |
| Alex Fernandez | former pitcher, Chicago White Sox and Florida Marlins (did not graduate) | |
| Gus Gandarillas | former pitcher, Minnesota Twins | |
| Orlando González | former first baseman, Cleveland Indians, Oakland Athletics, and Philadelphia Phillies | |
| Joe Grahe | former pitcher, California Angels, Colorado Rockies, and Philadelphia Phillies | |
| Danny Graves | former pitcher, Cleveland Indians, Cincinnati Reds, and New York Mets | |
| Neal Heaton | former pitcher, Cleveland Indians, Kansas City Royals, Milwaukee Brewers, Minnesota Twins, Montreal Expos, New York Yankees, and Pittsburgh Pirates | |
| Chris Herrmann | former catcher and outfielder, Arizona Diamondbacks, Minnesota Twins, Oakland Athletics, and Seattle Mariners | |
| Aubrey Huff | former first baseman, Baltimore Orioles, Detroit Tigers, Houston Astros, San Francisco Giants, and Tampa Bay Devil Rays | |
| Ryan Jackson | former shortstop, Los Angeles Angels and Washington Nationals | |
| Jon Jay | former center fielder, Arizona Diamondbacks, Chicago Cubs, Chicago White Sox, Kansas City Royals, Los Angeles Angels, San Diego Padres, and St. Louis Cardinals | |
| Charlton Jimerson | former center fielder, Houston Astros and Seattle Mariners | |
| Charles Johnson | former catcher, Baltimore Orioles, Colorado Rockies, Chicago White Sox, Florida Marlins, Los Angeles Dodgers, and Tampa Bay Devil Rays (did not graduate) | |
| Wayne Krenchicki | former third baseman, Baltimore Orioles, Cincinnati Reds, Detroit Tigers, and Montreal Expos | |
| Jason Michaels | former left fielder, Cleveland Indians, Houston Astros, Philadelphia Phillies, and Pittsburgh Pirates | |
| Oscar Múñoz | former pitcher, Minnesota Twins | |
| Mike Pagliarulo | former infielder, Baltimore Orioles, Minnesota Twins, New York Yankees, San Diego Padres, and Texas Rangers | |
| Orlando Palmeiro | former outfielder, Anaheim Angels, Houston Astros, and St. Louis Cardinals (did not graduate) | |
| Chris Perez | former relief pitcher, Cleveland Indians, Los Angeles Dodgers, and St. Louis Cardinals | |
| Al Richter | former shortstop, Boston Red Sox | |
| Alex Rodriguez | former third baseman, New York Yankees, Seattle Mariners, and Texas Rangers (did not graduate) | |
| Gaby Sánchez | former first baseman, Miami Marlins and Pittsburgh Pirates | |
| F. P. Santangelo | former outfielder, Los Angeles Dodgers, Montreal Expos, Oakland Athletics, and San Francisco Giants | |
| Nelson Santovenia | former catcher, Chicago White Sox, Kansas City Royals, and Montreal Expos | |
| Mike Schemer | former first baseman, New York Giants | |
| Wade Taylor | former pitcher, New York Yankees | |
| Blake Tekotte | former right fielder, Chicago White Sox and San Diego Padres | |
| Greg Vaughn | former outfielder, Cincinnati Reds, Colorado Rockies, Milwaukee Brewers, San Diego Padres, and Tampa Bay Devil Rays (did not graduate) | |
| Jemile Weeks | former second baseman, Baltimore Orioles, Boston Red Sox, Chicago Cubs, Oakland Athletics, and San Diego Padres | |

=== Basketball ===
==== Current NBA and NBA G players ====
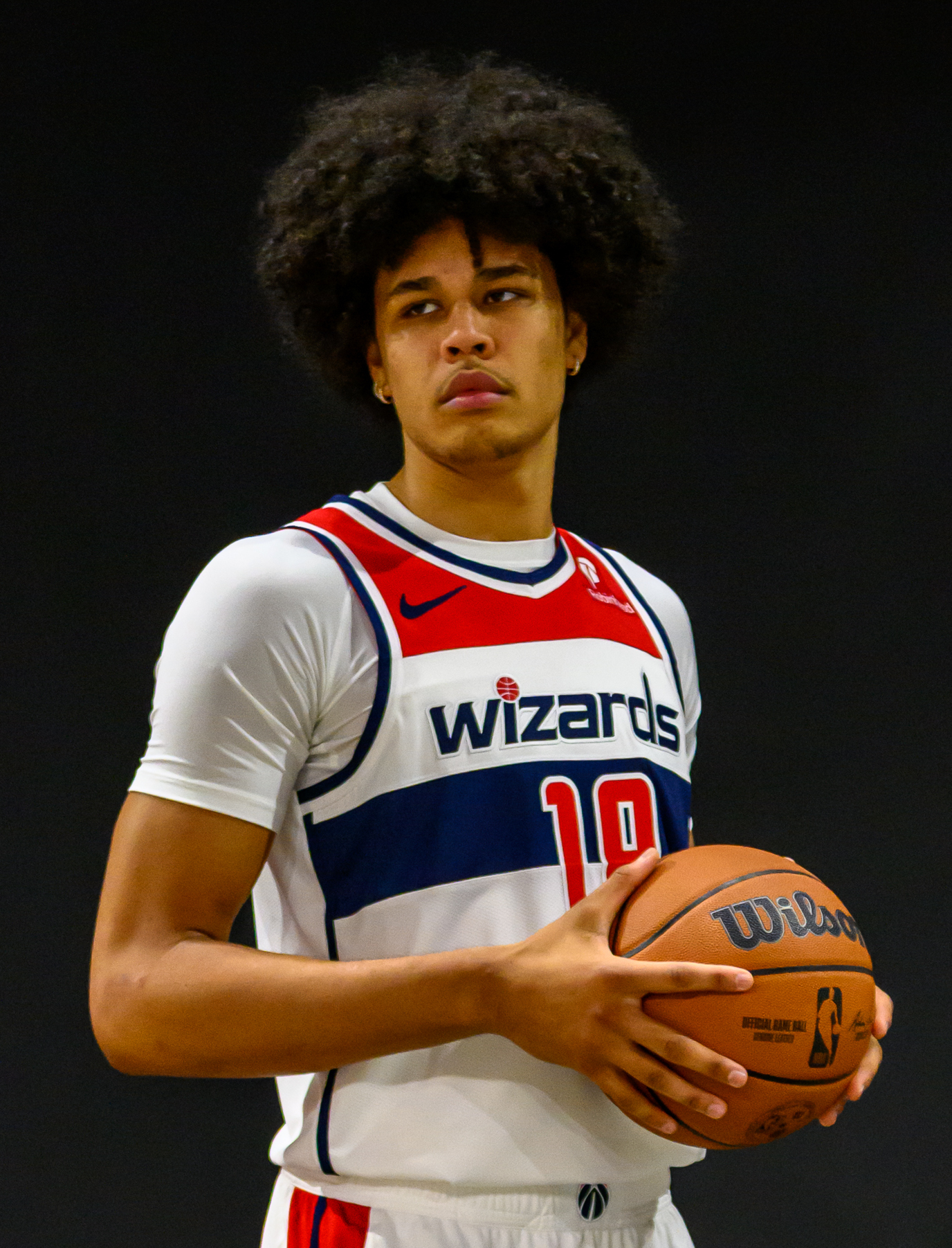
Kyshawn George

| Alumnus | Notability | Reference |
|---|---|---|
| Bruce Brown | shooting guard, Denver Nuggets | |
| Kyshawn George | forward, Washington Wizards | |
| Jordan Miller | small forward, Los Angeles Clippers | |

==== Current international players ====
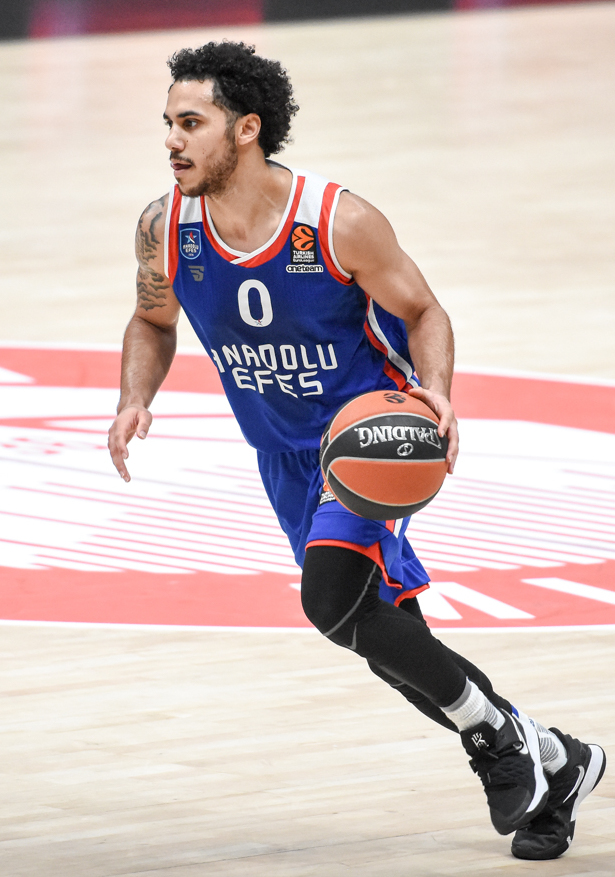
Shane Larkin

Lonnie Walker

| Alumnus | Notability | Reference |
|---|---|---|
| Rion Brown | small forward and shooting guard, Panionios of the Greek Basket League | |
| Noam Dovrat | point guard / shooting guard, Ironi Ness Ziona of the Israeli Basketball Premier League | |
| Dewan Hernandez | center, Busan KCC Egis of the Korean Basketball League | |
| Tonye Jekiri | center, KK Partizan of the ABA League JTD | |
| Kenny Kadji | center, Al-Ahli of the Bahraini Premier League | |
| Shane Larkin | guard, Anadolu Efes of the Turkish Basketball Super League (BSL) of EuroLeague | |
| Manu Lecomte | guard, Start Lublin of Polish Basketball League | |
| Kameron McGusty | shooting guard, London Lions of the SLB of EuroCup | |
| Trey McKinney-Jones | shooting guard, Gunma Crane Thunders of B.League | |
| Davon Reed | shooting guard, Santeros de Aguada of Baloncesto Superior Nacional | |
| Durand Scott | shooting guard, Maccabi Ashdod B.C. of Liga Leumit | |
| Lonnie Walker IV | shooting guard, Maccabi Tel Aviv of the Israeli Basketball Premier League and EuroLeague | |
| Isaiah Wong | guard, CB Gran Canaria of Liga ACB | |

==== Former NBA players ====
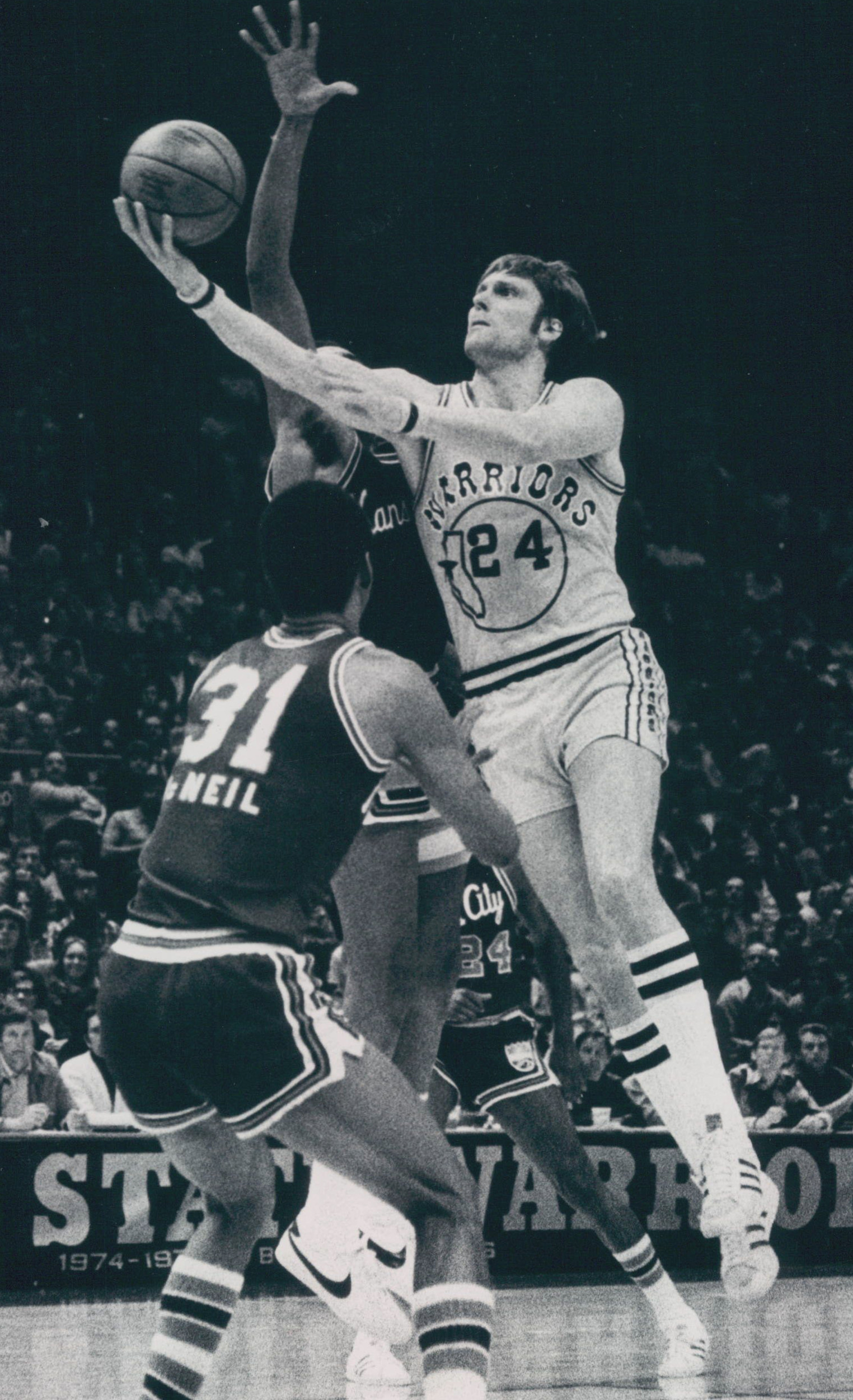
Rick Barry

| Alumnus | Notability | Reference |
|---|---|---|
| Rick Barry | former small forward, Golden State Warriors and Houston Rockets, member of Naismith Memorial Basketball Hall of Fame | |
| Dwayne Collins | former power forward, Phoenix Suns | |
| Dewan Hernandez | former power forward and center, Toronto Raptors | |
| Tito Horford | former center, Milwaukee Bucks and Washington Bullets | |
| Tim James | former forward, Charlotte Hornets, Miami Heat, and Philadelphia 76ers | |
| DeQuan Jones | former small forward, Orlando Magic | |
| James Jones | former small forward and shooting guard, Cleveland Cavaliers, Indiana Pacers, Miami Heat, Phoenix Suns, and Portland Trail Blazers, and current general manager, Phoenix Suns | |
| John Salmons | former small forward, Chicago Bulls, Milwaukee Bucks, New Orleans Pelicans, Philadelphia 76ers, Sacramento Kings, and Toronto Raptors | |
| Amar'e Stoudemire | former power forward, Phoenix Suns, New York Knicks, Dallas Mavericks, and Miami Heat (never played for the school; M.B.A. 2022) | |

==== Former WNBA players ====
| Alumnus | Notability | Reference |
|---|---|---|
| Octavia Blue | former forward, Los Angeles Sparks and Houston Comets | |
| Tamara James | former small forward, Washington Mystics | |
| Shenise Johnson | former point guard and shooting guard, Indiana Fever, Minnesota Lynx, and San Antonio Stars, and gold medalist on 2009 USA Women's U19 team | |
| Riquna Williams | former guard, Las Vegas Aces and Los Angeles Sparks and 2013 WNBA Sixth Player of the Year Award recipient | |

=== Football ===
Nearly 400 Miami Hurricanes football players have gone on to play professional football at the NFL level, the highest level of play in the sport, including 369 draft picks and 67 first-round selections. University of Miami alumni have earned 153 Pro Bowl selections, and eleven have been inducted into the Pro Football Hall of Fame: Jim Otto (1980), Ted Hendricks (1990), Jim Kelly (2002), Michael Irvin (2007), Cortez Kennedy (2012), Warren Sapp (2013), Ray Lewis (2018), Ed Reed (2019), Edgerrin James (2020), and Devin Hester and Andre Johnson (2024).

==== Current NFL players ====
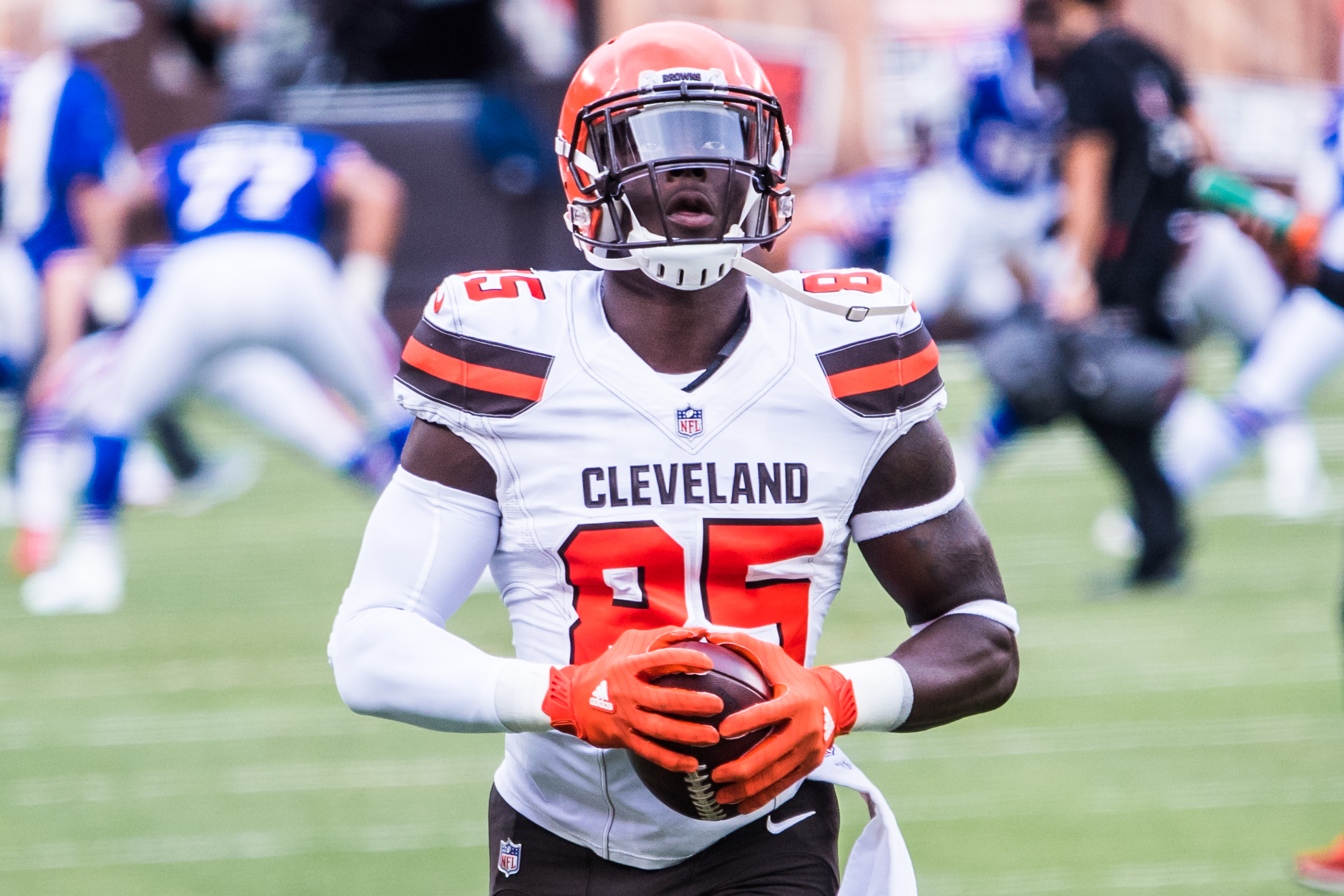
David Njoku

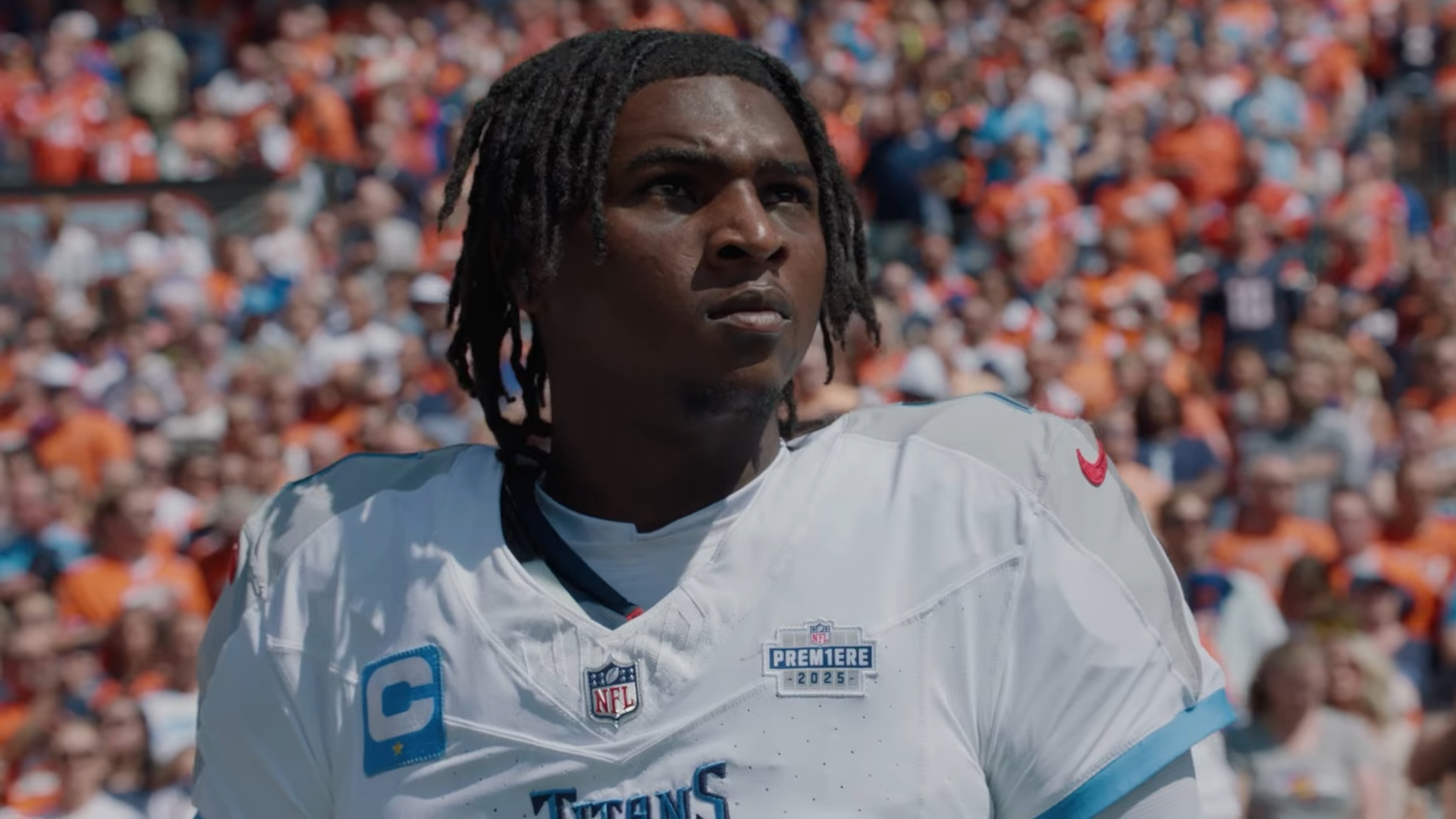
Cam Ward

| Alumnus | Notability | Reference |
|---|---|---|
| Elijah Arroyo | tight end, Seattle Seahawks | |
| Michael Badgley | free agent kicker | |
| Rueben Bain Jr. | defensive end, Tampa Bay Buccaneers | |
| Tyler Baron | defensive end, New York Jets | |
| Simeon Barrow | free agent defensive lineman | |
| Carson Beck | quarterback, Arizona Cardinals | |
| Markel Bell | offensive tackle, Philadelphia Eagles | |
| Braxton Berrios | free agent wide receiver and return specialist | |
| Andrés Borregales | kicker, New England Patriots | |
| Artie Burns | free agent cornerback | |
| Deon Bush | free agent safety | |
| Lawrence Cager | wide receiver, Washington Commanders | |
| Calais Campbell | free agent defensive end | |
| Adrian Colbert | free agent safety | |
| Anez Cooper | offensive guard, New York Jets | |
| DeeJay Dallas | running back and return specialist, Jacksonville Jaguars | |
| CJ Daniels | wide receiver, Los Angeles Rams | |
| Jaden Davis | cornerback, Arizona Cardinals | |
| Phillip Dorsett | wide receiver, Las Vegas Raiders | |
| Jonathan Ford | nose tackle, Green Bay Packers | |
| Jonathan Garvin | linebacker, Chicago Bears | |
| Jared Harrison-Hunte | defensive end, Carolina Panthers | |
| Travis Homer | running back, Pittsburgh Steelers | |
| D. J. Ivey | cornerback, Cincinnati Bengals | |
| Mike Jackson | cornerback, Carolina Panthers | |
| Rayshawn Jenkins | free agent safety | |
| D. J. Johnson | defensive end, Washington Commanders | |
| Brevin Jordan | tight end, Houston Texans | |
| Kamren Kinchens | safety, Los Angeles Rams | |
| Matt Lee | free agent center | |
| Damien Martinez | running back, Green Bay Packers | |
| Will Mallory | tight end, Indianapolis Colts | |
| Francis Mauigoa | offensive tackle, New York Giants | |
| Akheem Mesidor | defensive end, Los Angeles Chargers | |
| Francisco Mauigoa | linebacker, New York Jets | |
| Jordan Miller | nose tackle, Denver Broncos | |
| Al-Quadin Muhammad | defensive end, Tampa Bay Buccaneers | |
| David Njoku | free agent tight end | |
| Pat O'Donnell | free agent punter | |
| K. J. Osborn | wide receiver, Tennessee Titans | |
| Denzel Perryman | linebacker, Los Angeles Chargers | |
| Jaelan Phillips | outside linebacker, Carolina Panthers | |
| Daryl Porter Jr. | cornerback, Buffalo Bills | |
| Shaq Quarterman | free agent linebacker | |
| Xavier Restrepo | wide receiver, Tennessee Titans | |
| Jalen Rivers | guard, Cincinnati Bengals | |
| Elijah Roberts | defensive end, Tampa Bay Buccaneers | |
| Greg Rousseau | defensive end, Buffalo Bills | |
| Keionte Scott | cornerback and safety, Tampa Bay Buccaneers | |
| Brashard Smith | running back and return specialist, Kansas City Chiefs | |
| Tyrique Stevenson | cornerback, Chicago Bears | |
| Leonard Taylor III | defensive tackle, New England Patriots | |
| Jakobe Thomas | safety, Minnesota Vikings | |
| Cam Ward | quarterback, Tennessee Titans | |
| James Williams | safety, Tennessee Titans | |

==== Current and former AFL, CFL, UFL, and NFL free agents ====
| Alumnus | Notability | Reference |
|---|---|---|
| Mitchell Agude | linebacker, free agent | |
| Al Blades Jr. | safety, free agent | |
| Jamal Carter | safety, free agent | |
| Javion Cohen | guard, St. Louis Battlehawks of the UFL | |
| Adrian Colbert | safety, free agent | |
| Branson Deen | defensive lineman, Hamilton Tiger-Cats of the Canadian Football League | |
| Dee Delaney | safety, Michigan Panthers of the UFL | |
| Gus Edwards | running back, free agent | |
| Jonathan Garvin | defensive end, free agent | |
| Jimmy Graham | tight end, free agent | |
| Mike Harley Jr. | wide receiver, Stuttgart Surge of the European League of Football | |
| Lou Hedley | punter, free agent | |
| Jaquan Johnson | safety, free agent | |
| Zach McCloud | linebacker, free agent | |
| R. J. McIntosh | defensive end, free agent | |
| N'Kosi Perry | quarterback, Louisville Kings of the UFL | |
| Michael Pinckney | linebacker, free agent | |
| Shaq Quarterman | linebacker, free agent | |
| Charleston Rambo | wide receiver, Montreal Alouettes of the Canadian Football League | |
| Quincy Roche | linebacker, free agent | |
| Nesta Jade Silvera | running back, free agent | |
| Tyree St. Louis | offensive tackle, free agent | |
| Vincent Testaverde Jr. | quarterback, free agent | |
| Jeff Thomas | wide receiver, free agent | |
| Herb Waters | cornerback, Carolina Cobras of the AFL | |
| Jarrid Williams | offensive tackle, Orlando Storm of the UFL | |
| Gerald Willis | defensive tackle, free agent | |

==== Former NFL players ====
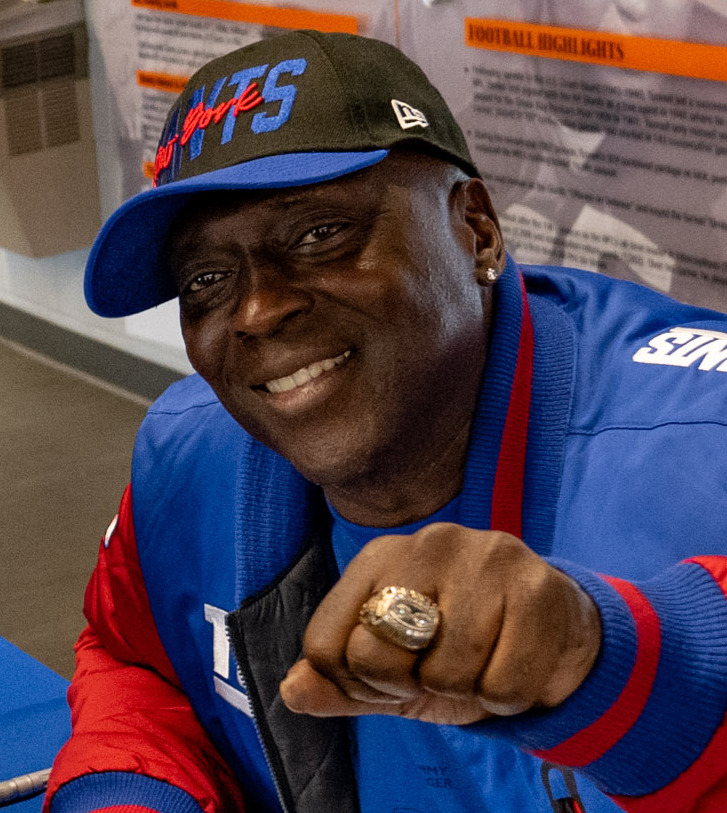
Ottis "O.J." Anderson

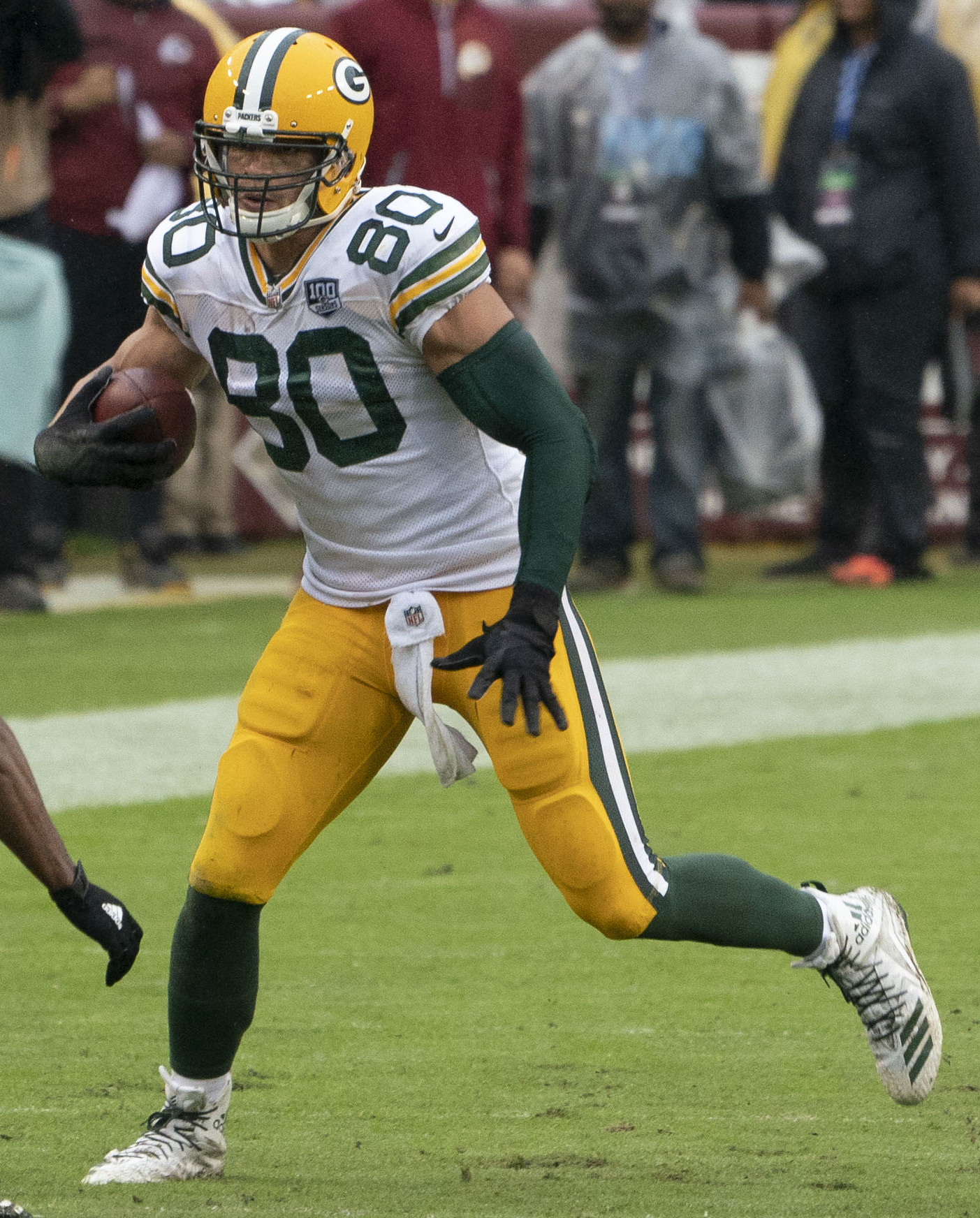
Jimmy Graham

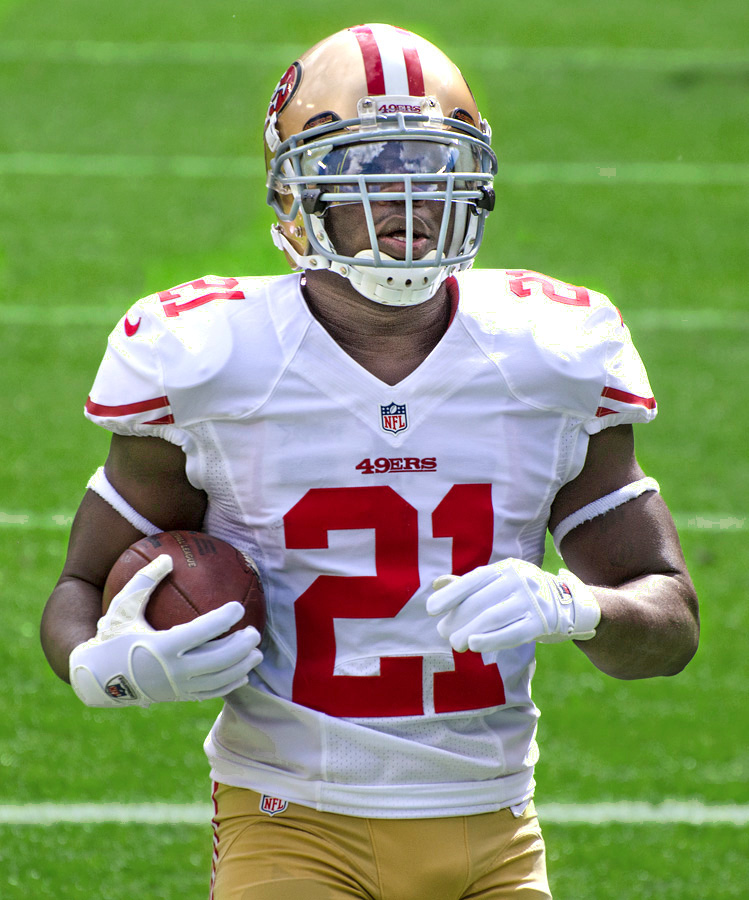
Frank Gore

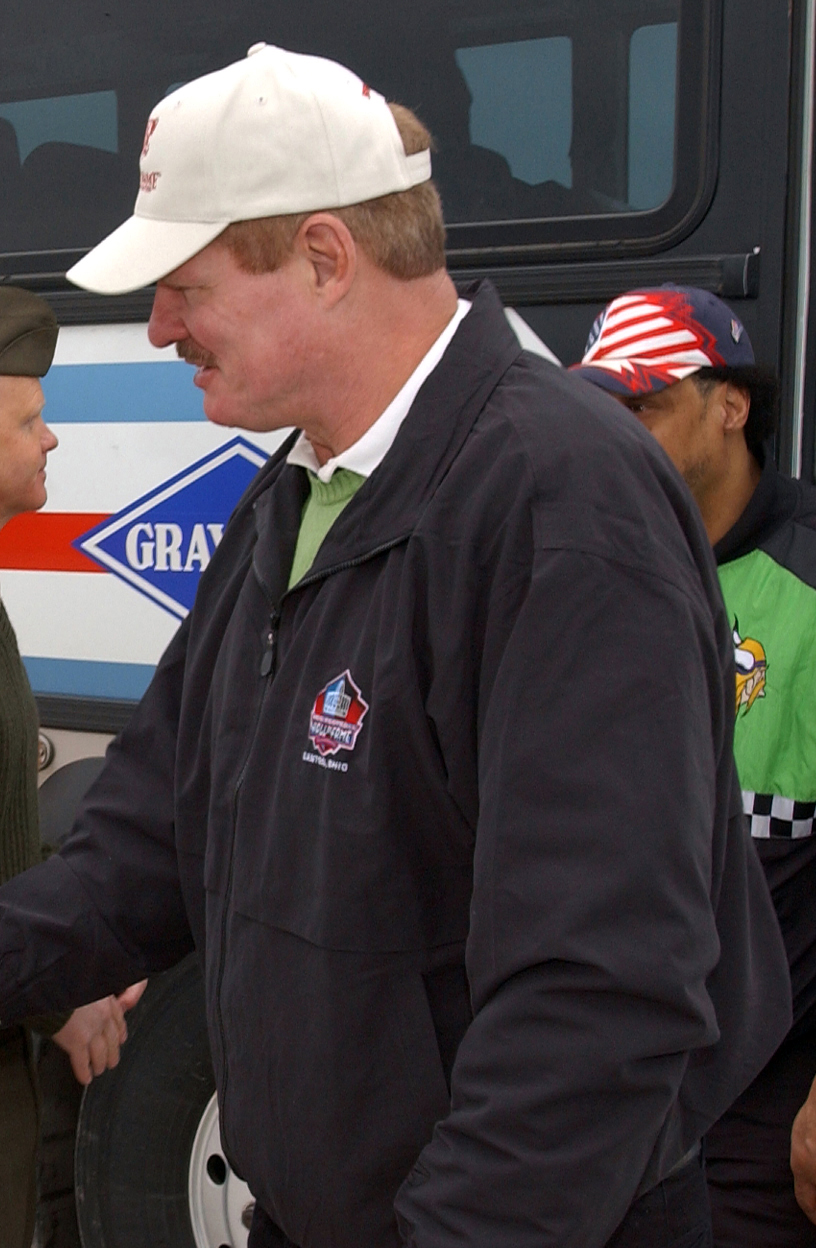
Ted Hendricks

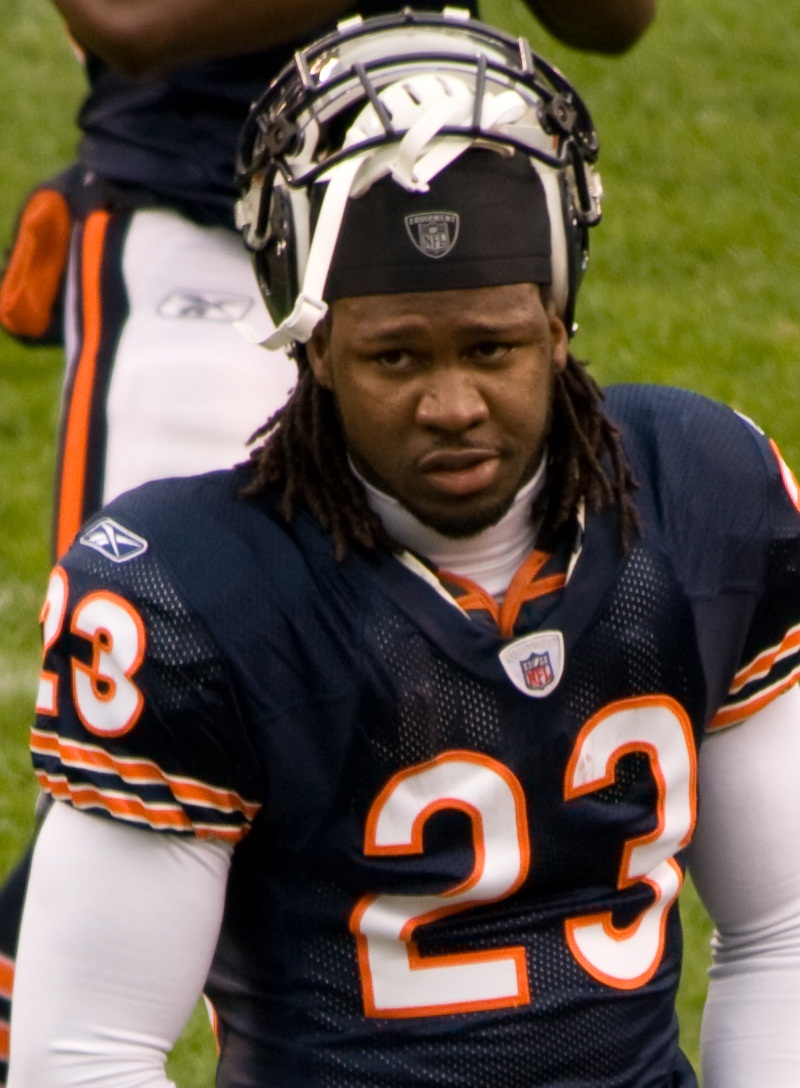
Devin Hester

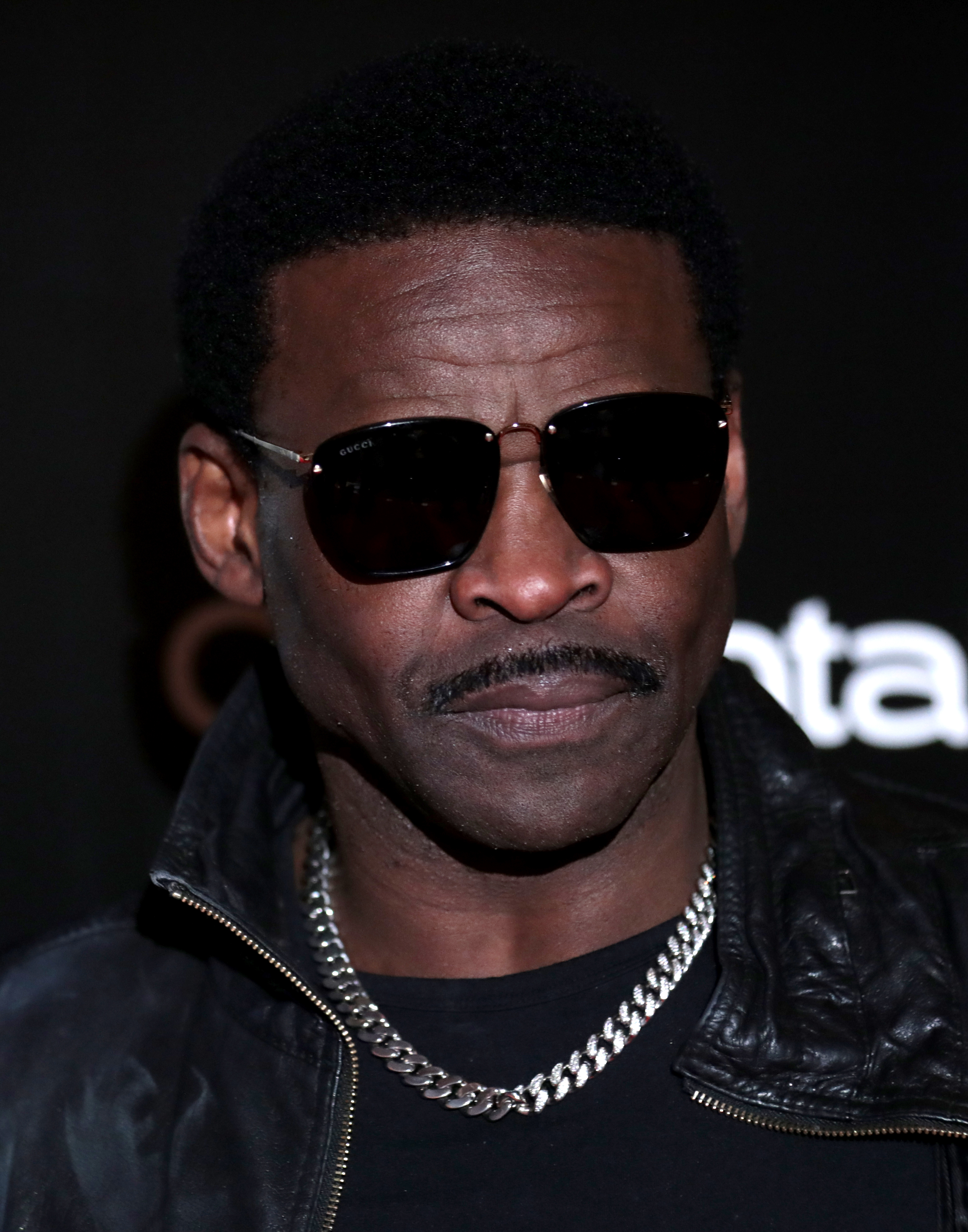
Michael Irvin

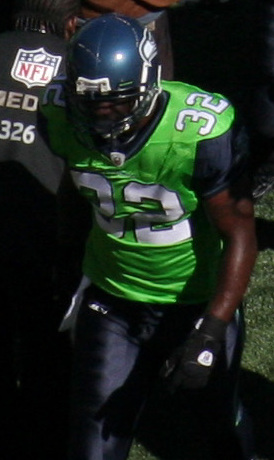
Edgerrin James

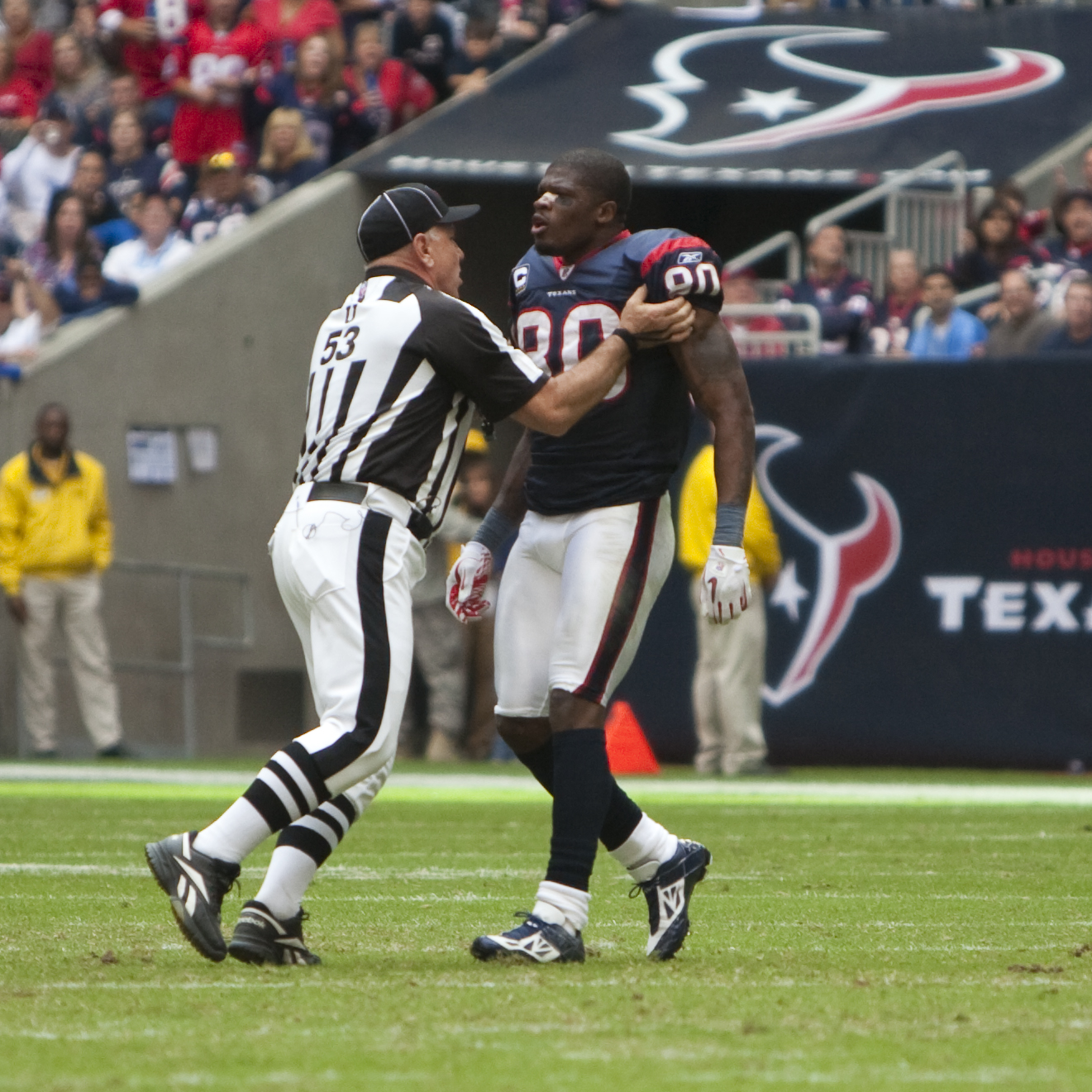
Andre Johnson

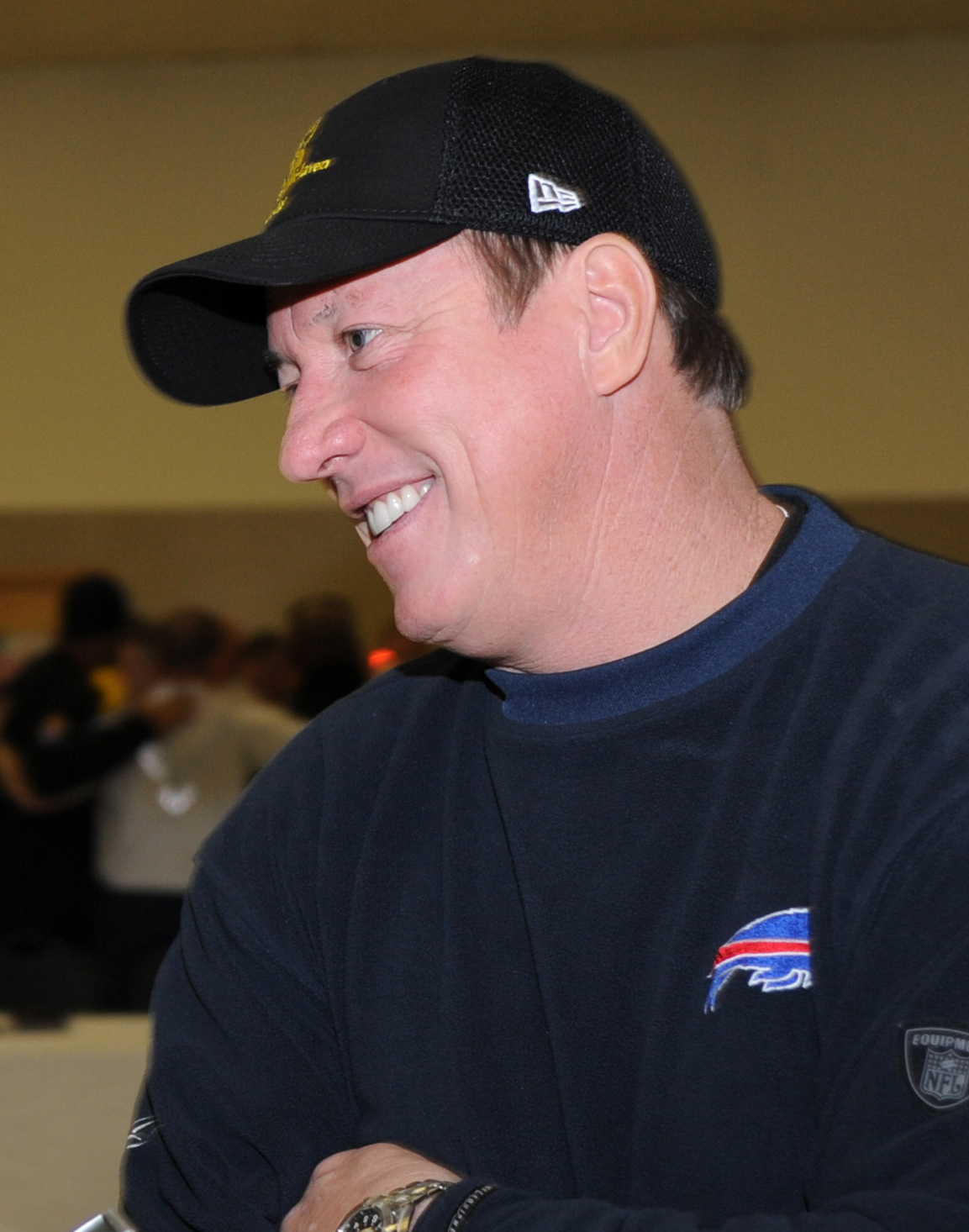
Jim Kelly

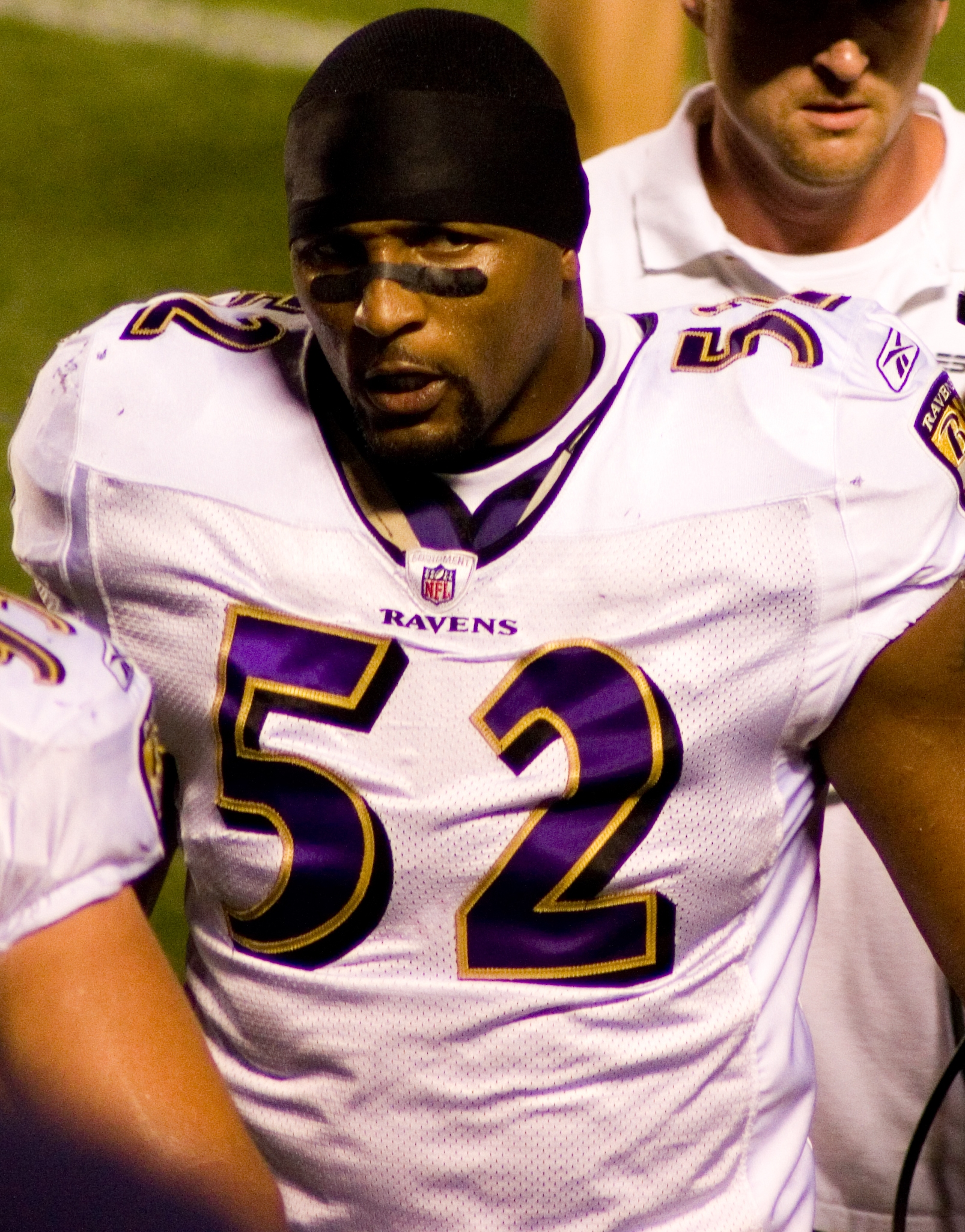
Ray Lewis

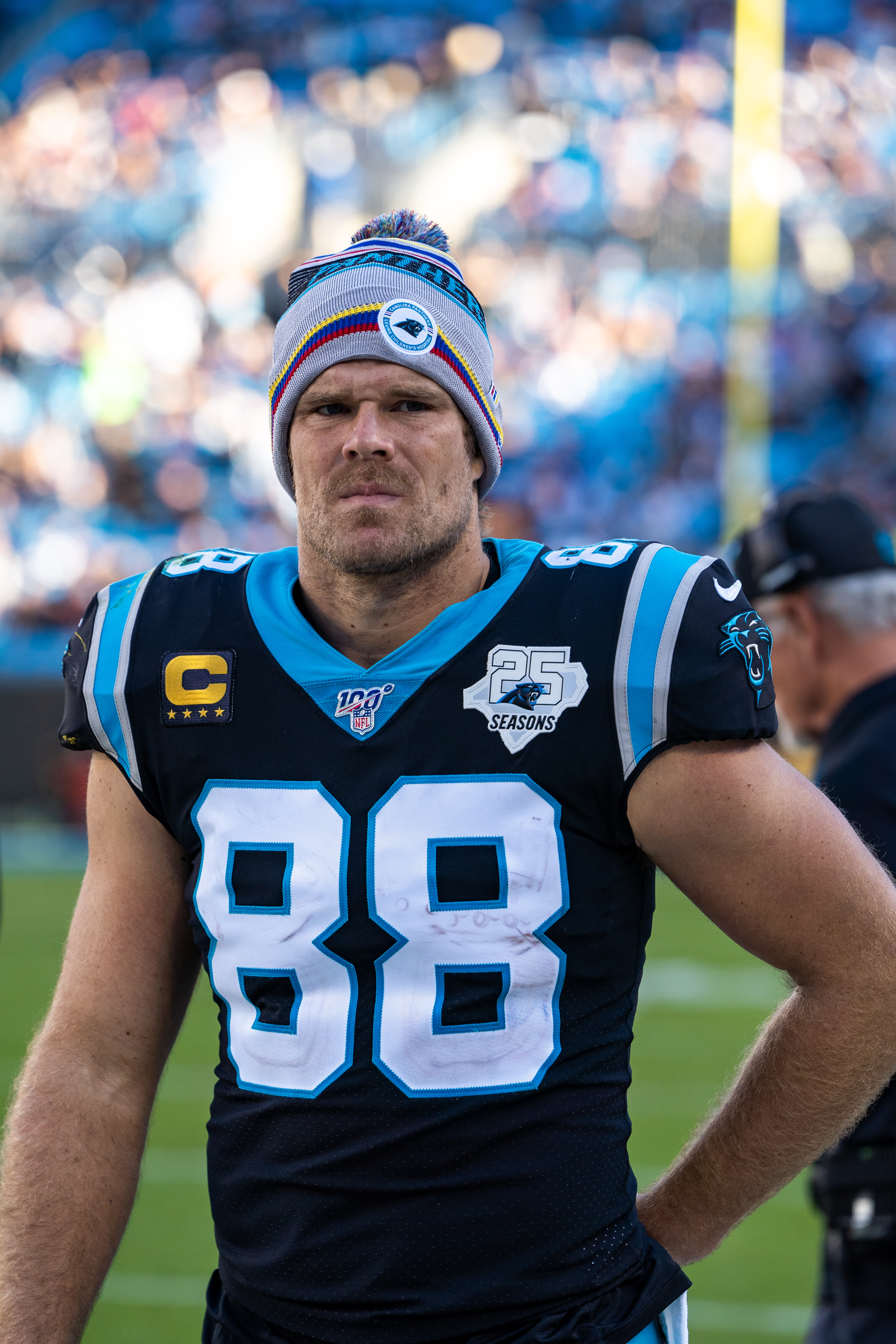
Greg Olsen

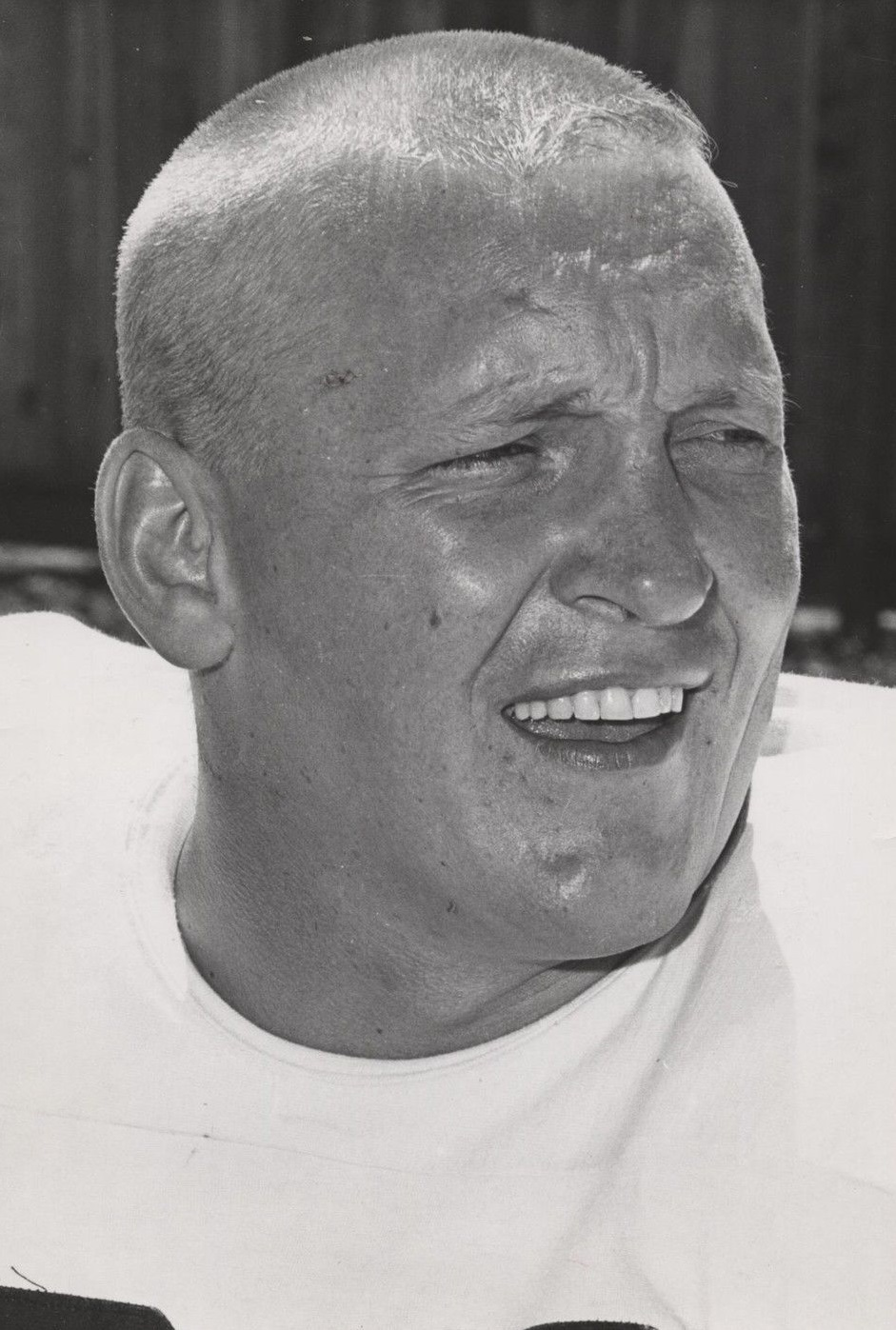
Jim Otto

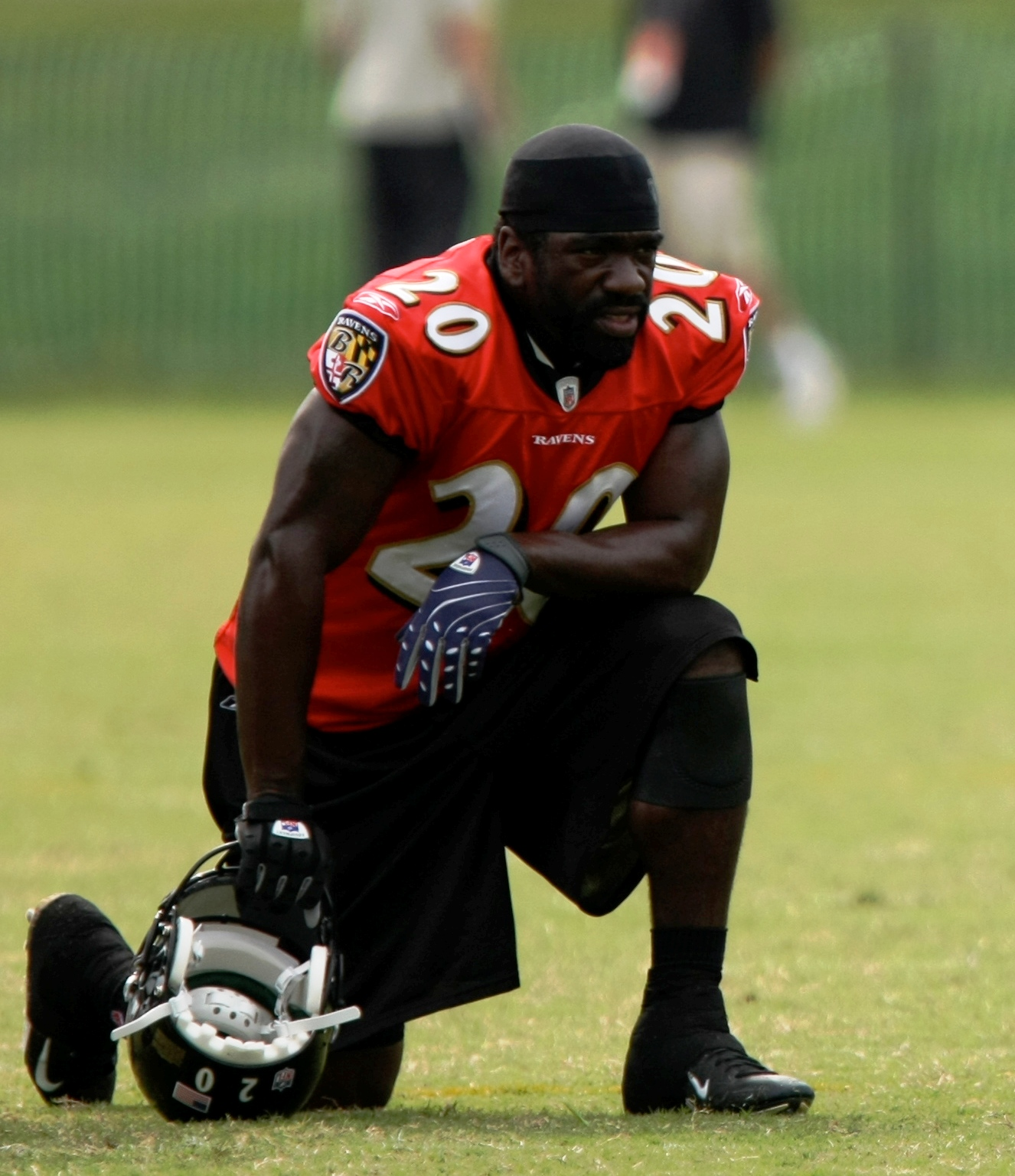
Ed Reed

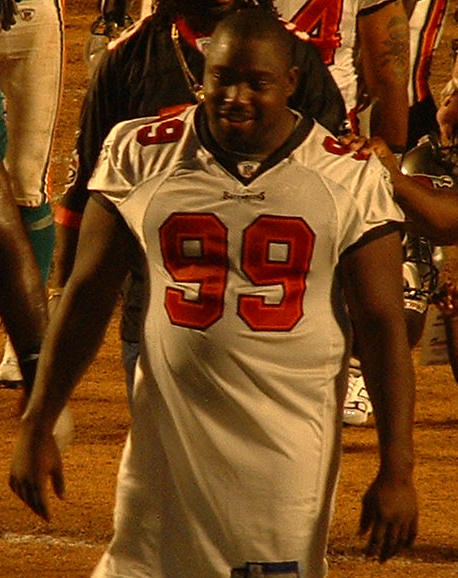
Warren Sapp

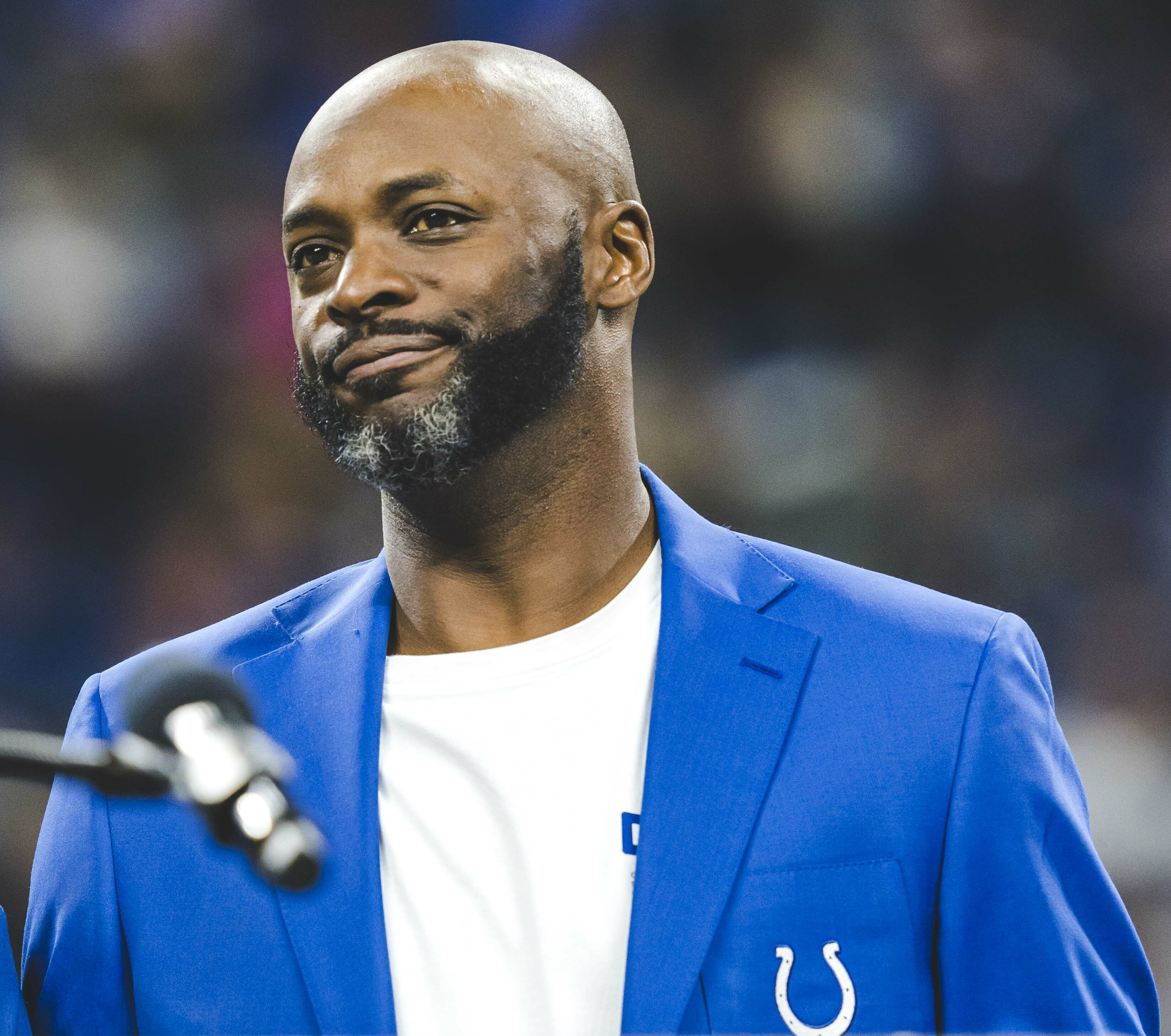
Reggie Wayne

| Alumnus | Notability | Reference |
|---|---|---|
| Spencer Adkins | former linebacker, Atlanta Falcons | |
| Steve Alvers | former tight end and center, New York Giants, Buffalo Bills and New York Jets | |
| Ottis "O.J." Anderson | former running back, New York Giants and St. Louis Cardinals; Super Bowl XXV MVP, NFL Offensive Rookie of Year (1979) and NFL Comeback Player of Year (1989) | |
| Thurston Armbrister | former linebacker, Arizona Cardinals, Detroit Lions, Jacksonville Jaguars, and New York Giants | |
| Jessie Armstead | former linebacker, Carolina Panthers, New York Giants, and Washington Redskins; New York Giants Ring of Honor, 5x Pro Bowl and 3x All-Pro | |
| Ray-Ray Armstrong | former linebacker, Cleveland Browns, Dallas Cowboys, New York Giants, New Orleans Saints, Oakland Raiders, San Francisco 49ers, Seattle Seahawks, and St. Louis Rams | |
| Baraka Atkins | former linebacker, Seattle Seahawks, and San Francisco 49ers | |
| Allen Bailey | former defensive end, Atlanta Falcons and Kansas City Chiefs | |
| Don Bailey | former center, Indianapolis Colts | |
| Robert Bailey | former cornerback, Los Angeles Rams, Washington Redskins, Dallas Cowboys, Miami Dolphins, Baltimore Ravens, and Detroit Lions | |
| Pete Banaszak | former running back, Oakland Raiders; NFL rushing touchdowns co-leader (1975) | |
| Mike Barnes | former defensive lineman, Colts; Pro Bowl (1977) | |
| Micheal Barrow | former linebacker, Carolina Panthers, Dallas Cowboys, Houston Oilers, New York Giants, and Washington Redskins | |
| Robert Bass | former linebacker, Chicago Bears and Green Bay Packers | |
| Jon Beason | former linebacker, Carolina Panthers and New York Giants; NFL solo tackles leader (2008), 3× Pro Bowl and 2x All-Pro | |
| Tom Beier | former safety, Miami Dolphins | |
| Rocky Belk | former wide receiver, Cleveland Browns | |
| Coleman Bell | former tight end, Washington Redskins and Seattle Seahawks | |
| Rodney Bellinger | former cornerback, Buffalo Bills | |
| Travis Benjamin | former wide receiver and return specialist, Cleveland Browns, San Diego/Los Angeles Chargers, and San Francisco 49ers | |
| Donnell Bennett | former fullback, Kansas City Chiefs and Washington Redskins | |
| Woody Bennett | former fullback, New York Jets and Miami Dolphins | |
| Albert Bentley | former running back, Indianapolis Colts and Pittsburgh Steelers | |
| Brock Berlin | former quarterback, Dallas Cowboys, Detroit Lions, Miami Dolphins, and St. Louis Rams | |
| Martin Bibla | former guard, Atlanta Falcons | |
| Al Blades | former safety, San Francisco 49ers | |
| Bennie Blades | former cornerback, Detroit Lions and Seattle Seahawks, and 2006 College Football Hall of Fame inductee; Detroit Lions All-Time Team, x3 All-Pro and Pro Bowl | |
| Brian Blades | former wide receiver, Seattle Seahawks; Seattle Seahawks 35th Anniversary team, Pro Bowl and All-Pro (1989) | |
| Kerlin Blaise | former guard, Detroit Lions | |
| Michael Boireau | former defensive end, Minnesota Vikings | |
| Johnny Bookman | former cornerback, Dallas Texans, New York Giants and Titans | |
| Matt Bosher | former punter, Atlanta Falcons | |
| Don Bosseler | former fullback, Washington Redskins; College Football Hall of Fame in 1990, 80 Greatest Redskins and Pro Bowl (1959) | |
| Mel Bratton | former running back, Denver Broncos | |
| Eddie Brown | former wide receiver, Cincinnati Bengals; NFL Offensive Rookie of the Year (1985), Pro Bowl and All-Pro (1988) | |
| Jerome Brown | former defensive tackle; Philadelphia Eagles Hall of Fame, 2× Pro Bowl and All-Pro | |
| Jim Burt | former nose tackle, New York Giants and San Francisco 49ers; Pro Bowl (1986) | |
| Rashad Butler | former offensive tackle, Carolina Panthers, Cleveland Browns, Houston Texans, and Pittsburgh Steelers | |
| LaRon Byrd | former wide receiver, Arizona Cardinals, Atlanta Falcons, Carolina Panthers, Cleveland Browns, Dallas Cowboys, Miami Dolphins, and Washington Redskins | |
| Al Carapella | former defensive tackle, San Francisco 49ers; Pro Bowl (1954) | |
| Vernon Carey | former offensive tackle, Miami Dolphins | |
| Billy Cesare | former defensive back, Detroit Lions, Miami Dolphins, and Tampa Bay Buccaneers | |
| Anthony Chickillo | defensive end, Denver Broncos, New Orleans Saints, and Pittsburgh Steelers | |
| Asante Cleveland | former tight end, New England Patriots, Los Angeles/San Diego Chargers, and San Francisco 49ers | |
| Tony Cline | former defensive end, Oakland Raiders and San Francisco 49ers | |
| Stacy Coley | former wide receiver, Minnesota Vikings and New York Giants | |
| Dan Conners | former middle linebacker, Oakland Raiders; 3× All-Pro | |
| Horace Copeland | former wide receiver, Miami Dolphins, Oakland Raiders, and Tampa Bay Buccaneers | |
| Shane Curry | former defensive lineman, Indianapolis Colts | |
| Najeh Davenport | former running back, Green Bay Packers, Indianapolis Colts, and Pittsburgh Steelers | |
| Ken Dorsey | former quarterback, San Francisco 49ers and Cleveland Browns | |
| Gary Dunn | former defensive tackle, Pittsburgh Steelers | |
| Eddie Edwards | former defensive end, Cincinnati Bengals; Cincinnati Bengals 50th Anniversary Team | |
| Corn Elder | former cornerback, Carolina Panthers and Washington Football Team/Washington Commanders | |
| Kevin Everett | former tight end, Buffalo Bills | |
| Kevin Fagan | former defensive end, San Francisco 49ers | |
| Jeff Feagles | former punter, Arizona Cardinals, New England Patriots, New York Giants, Philadelphia Eagles, and Seattle Seahawks | |
| Jon Feliciano | former offensive guard, Buffalo Bills, New York Giants, Oakland Raiders, and San Francisco 49ers | |
| Ereck Flowers | former offensive tackle, Jacksonville Jaguars, Miami Dolphins, New York Giants, and Washington Redskins/Washington Commanders | |
| Chase Ford | former tight end, Baltimore Ravens, Cleveland Browns, Minnesota Vikings, and Philadelphia Eagles | |
| Chuck Foreman | former running back, Minnesota Vikings and New England Patriots; NFL Offensive Rookie of the Year (1973), 5× Pro Bowl, 4x All-Pro, Minnesota Vikings Ring of Honor-50 Greatest Vikings | |
| Marcus Forston | former defensive tackle, New England Patriots and St. Louis Rams | |
| Jason Curtis Fox | former offensive tackle, Detroit Lions and Miami Dolphins | |
| Orlando Franklin | former offensive tackle, Denver Broncos, New Orleans Saints, San Diego Chargers, and Washington Redskins | |
| Bubba Franks | former tight end, Green Bay Packers and New York Jets; NFL Alumni Tight End of the Year (2002) and 3× Pro Bowl | |
| Richard Gordon | former tight end, Baltimore Ravens, Denver Broncos, Kansas City Chiefs, Oakland Raiders, Pittsburgh Steelers, and Tennessee Titans | |
| Frank Gore | former running back; San Francisco 49ers Hall of Fame, Most Improved Player of the Year (2006), Art Rooney Award (2016), NFL 2010s All-Decade Team, 5× Pro Bowl, and (3rd all-time in career rushing yards) | |
| Jermaine Grace | former linebacker, Atlanta Falcons, Indianapolis Colts, and Seattle Seahawks | |
| Jimmy Graham | former tight end, Seattle Seahawks, Green Bay Packers, Chicago Bears, New Orleans Saints; NFL receiving touchdowns leader (2013), 5× Pro Bowl and x2 All-Pro | |
| LaDarius Gunter | former cornerback, Carolina Panthers and Green Bay Packers | |
| Mike Haggerty | former offensive tackle, Detroit Lions, New England Patriots, and Pittsburgh Steelers | |
| Leonard Hankerson | former wide receiver, Atlanta Falcons, Buffalo Bills, New England Patriots, and Washington Redskins | |
| Dennis Harrah | former tackle, Los Angeles Rams; Los Angeles Rams 40th Anniversary Team, 6× Pro Bowl and All-Pro | |
| Brandon Harris | former cornerback, Houston Texans, Miami Dolphins, and Tennessee Titans | |
| Jake Heaps | former quarterback, New York Jets and Seattle Seahawks | |
| Seantrel Henderson | former offensive tackle, Buffalo Bills and Houston Texans | |
| Ted Hendricks | former linebacker, Baltimore Colts, Green Bay Packers, and Oakland Raiders; Baltimore Ravens Ring of Honor, NFL 100th Anniversary All-Time Team, 1990 Pro Football Hall of Fame inductee | |
| Chris Herndon | former tight end, Minnesota Vikings and New York Jets | |
| Devin Hester | former wide receiver and return specialist; 100 Greatest Bears of All-Time, NFL 100th Anniversary All-Time Team, NFL 2000s All-Decade Team, NFL 2010s All-Decade Team and 2024 Pro Football Hall of Fame inductee | |
| Alonzo Highsmith | former running back, Dallas Cowboys, Houston Oilers, and Tampa Bay Buccaneers | |
| Tracy Howard | former free safety, Cleveland Browns | |
| Allen Hurns | former wide receiver, Dallas Cowboys, Jacksonville Jaguars, and Miami Dolphins | |
| Michael Irvin | former wide receiver, Dallas Cowboys; Dallas Cowboys Ring of Honor, NFL receiving yards leader (1991), NFL 1990s All-Decade Team, 2007 Pro Football Hall of Fame inductee | |
| Danny Isidora | former offensive guard, Kansas City Chiefs, Miami Dolphins, Minnesota Vikings, and Pittsburgh Steelers | |
| Joe Jackson | former defensive end, Cleveland Browns and Dallas Cowboys | |
| Edgerrin James | former running back; Indianapolis Colts Ring of Honor, NFL 2000s All-Decade Team, 2× NFL rushing yards leader (1999, 2000), 4× Pro Bowl, NFL Offensive Rookie of Year (1999), 2020 Pro Football Hall of Fame inductee | |
| Mike James | former running back, Detroit Lions and Tampa Bay Buccaneers | |
| Andre Johnson | former wide receiver; Houston Texans Ring of Honor, 2× NFL receptions leader (2006, 2008), 2× NFL receiving yds leader (2008, 2009), 2024 Pro Football Hall of Fame inductee | |
| Duke Johnson | former running back, Buffalo Bills, Cleveland Browns, Houston Texans, Jacksonville Jaguars, and Miami Dolphins | |
| Brad Kaaya | former quarterback, Carolina Panthers, Cincinnati Bengals, Detroit Lions, and Indianapolis Colts | |
| Ufomba Kamalu | former defensive end, Baltimore Ravens, Houston Texans, and New England Patriots | |
| Jim Kelly | former quarterback; Buffalo Bills Wall of Fame, NFL passer rating leader (1990), NFL completion percentage leader (1990), NFL passing touchdowns leader (1991), 5× Pro Bowl, USFL MVP (1984), 2002 Pro Football Hall of Fame inductee | |
| Cortez Kennedy | former defensive tackle; Seattle Seahawks Ring of Honor, NFL Defensive Player of the Year (1992), NFL 1990s All-Decade Team, 2012 Pro Football Hall of Fame inductee | |
| Bernie Kosar | former quarterback; Cleveland Browns Legends and Pro Bowl (1987) | |
| Ray Lewis | former linebacker; Baltimore Ravens Ring of Honor, Super Bowl XXXV MVP, NFL 100th Anniversary All-Time Team, NFL 2000s All-Decade Team, and 2018 Pro Football Hall of Fame inductee | |
| Brandon Linder | former offensive guard, Jacksonville Jaguars | |
| Fred Marion | former safety, New England Patriots; Patriots All-1980s Team, Patriots 35th Anniversary Team, Patriots 50th Anniversary Team and Pro Bowl (1985) | |
| Alfonso Marshall | former cornerback, Chicago Bears | |
| Russell Maryland | former defensive tackle, Dallas Cowboys, Green Bay Packers, and Oakland Raiders; Pro Bowl (1993) | |
| Colin McCarthy | former linebacker, Tennessee Titans | |
| K. C. McDermott | former guard, Jacksonville Jaguars, New York Giants and Houston Texans | |
| Jerome McDougle | former defensive end, New York Giants and Philadelphia Eagles | |
| Willis McGahee | former running back, Buffalo Bills, Baltimore Ravens, and Denver Broncos; PFWA NFL Comeback Player of Year (2004) and 2× Pro Bowl | |
| Brandon McGee | former cornerback, Dallas Cowboys, Detroit Lions, New York Giants, and St. Louis Rams | |
| R. J. McIntosh | former defensive end, New York Giants | |
| Bryant McKinnie | former offensive tackle, Baltimore Ravens, Miami Dolphins, and Minnesota Vikings; Pro Bowl (2009) | |
| Ryan McNeil | former cornerback, Detroit Lions, St. Louis Rams, Cleveland Browns, Dallas Cowboys, San Diego Chargers, Denver Broncos; NFL interceptions leader (1997) and Pro Bowl (2001) | |
| Brandon Meriweather | former safety, Chicago Bears, New England Patriots, New York Giants, and Washington Redskins; 2× Pro Bowl | |
| Dan Miller | former kicker, New England Patriots and Colts | |
| Lamar Miller | former running back, Chicago Bears, Houston Texans, Miami Dolphins, and Washington Football Team; Pro Bowl (2018) | |
| George Mira | former quarterback, Miami Dolphins, Philadelphia Eagles, and San Francisco 49ers | |
| Dan Morgan | former linebacker, Carolina Panthers | |
| Stephen Morris | former quarterback, Indianapolis Colts, Jacksonville Jaguars, and Philadelphia Eagles | |
| Santana Moss | former wide receiver; Washington Commanders Ring of Fame, Pro Bowl and All-Pro (2005) | |
| Chris Myers | former offensive guard and center, Denver Broncos and Houston Texans; 2× Pro Bowl | |
| Ed Newman | former offensive guard, Miami Dolphins | |
| Kendrick Norton | former defensive end, Carolina Panthers and Miami Dolphins | |
| Adewale Ojomo | former defensive end, Buffalo Bills, Dallas Cowboys, New York Giants, Seattle Seahawks, and Tennessee Titans | |
| Greg Olsen | former tight end, Carolina Panthers, Chicago Bears, and Seattle Seahawks; first tight end in NFL history to record three consecutive seasons with 1,000 receiving yards, 3× Pro Bowl and 2× All-Pro | |
| Buck Ortega | former tight end, Cleveland Browns, Miami Dolphins, New Orleans Saints, and Washington Redskins | |
| Jim Otto | former center, Oakland Raiders; NFL 100th Anniversary All-Time Team and 1980 Pro Football Hall of Fame inductee | |
| Burgess Owens | former safety, New York Jets and Oakland/Los Angeles Raiders | |
| Roscoe Parrish | former wide receiver, Buffalo Bills | |
| Brett Perriman | former wide receiver, Detroit Lions, Kansas City Chiefs, Miami Dolphins, and New Orleans Saints | |
| Olsen Pierre | former defensive end, Arizona Cardinals, New York Giants, and Los Angeles/Oakland Raiders | |
| Clinton Portis | former running back, Denver Broncos and Washington Redskins; NFL Offensive Rookie of the Year (2002), 2× Pro Bowl & All-Pro | |
| Sheldrick Redwine | former safety, Cleveland Browns, Miami Dolphins, and New York Jets | |
| Ed Reed | former free safety; Baltimore Ravens Ring of Honor, NFL Defensive Player of Year (2004), NFL Alumni Defensive Back of the Year (2008), 3× NFL interceptions leader, NFL 2000s All-Decade Team, NFL 100th Anniversary All-Time Team, and 2019 Pro Football Hall of Fame inductee | |
| Antrel Rolle | former free safety, Arizona Cardinals, Chicago Bears, and New York Giants; 3× Pro Bowl and 2× Second-team All-Pro | |
| Warren Sapp | former defensive tackle; Tampa Bay Buccaneers Ring of Honor, NFL Defensive Player of the Year (1999), NFL 1990s All-Decade Team, NFL 2000s All-Decade Team, and 2013 Pro Football Hall of Fame inductee (did not graduate) | |
| Rashawn Scott | former wide receiver, Miami Dolphins | |
| Leon Searcy | former offensive tackle, Baltimore Ravens, Jacksonville Jaguars, Miami Dolphins, and Pittsburgh Steelers; Pro Bowl and All-Pro (1999) | |
| Darryl Sharpton | former linebacker, Arizona Cardinals, Chicago Bears, Houston Texans, and Washington Redskins | |
| Sam Shields | former cornerback, Green Bay Packers and Los Angeles Rams; Pro Bowl (2014) | |
| Jeremy Shockey | former tight end, New York Giants, New Orleans Saints, and Carolina Panthers; NFL Alumni Tight End of the Year (2005) and 4× Pro Bowl | |
| Dan Sileo | former defensive tackle, Tampa Bay Buccaneers | |
| Darrin Smith | former linebacker, Dallas Cowboys, New Orleans Saints, Philadelphia Eagles, and Seattle Seahawks | |
| Willie Smith | former tight end, Cleveland Browns and Miami Dolphins | |
| Sean Spence | former linebacker, Indianapolis Colts, Pittsburgh Steelers, and Tennessee Titans | |
| Tommy Streeter | former wide receiver, Baltimore Ravens, Buffalo Bills, Jacksonville Jaguars, Miami Dolphins, and Tampa Bay Buccaneers | |
| Danny Stubbs | former defensive end, Cincinnati Bengals, Dallas Cowboys, Miami Dolphins, Philadelphia Eagles, and San Francisco 49ers | |
| Erik Swoope | former tight end, Indianapolis Colts and New Orleans Saints | |
| Sean Taylor | former free safety; Washington Redskins Ring of Fame | |
| Vinny Testaverde | former quarterback, Baltimore Ravens, Carolina Panthers, Cleveland Browns, Dallas Cowboys, New England Patriots, New York Jets, Tampa Bay Buccaneers; 1986 Heisman Trophy winner and 2× Pro Bowl | |
| Chad Thomas | former defensive end, Cleveland Browns | |
| Lamar Thomas | former wide receiver, Miami Dolphins and Tampa Bay Buccaneers | |
| Santonio Thomas | former defensive end, Cleveland Browns and New England Patriots | |
| Gino Torretta | former quarterback, Detroit Lions, Minnesota Vikings, San Francisco 49ers, Seattle Seahawks, and 1992 Heisman Trophy winner | |
| Olivier Vernon | former defensive end and outside linebacker, Cleveland Browns, Miami Dolphins, and New York Giants; Pro Bowl (2018) and All-Pro (2016) | |
| Jonathan Vilma | former linebacker; New Orleans Saints Hall of Fame, NFL Defensive Rookie of Year (2004), NFL solo tackles leader (2005), NFL combined tackles leader (2005) and 3× Pro Bowl | |
| Justin Vogel | former punter, Green Bay Packers | |
| Jim Vollenweider | former running back, San Francisco 49ers | |
| Clive Walford | former tight end, Indianapolis Colts, Miami Dolphins, and Oakland Raiders | |
| Mark Walton | former running back, Cincinnati Bengals and Miami Dolphins | |
| Brandon Washington | former offensive guard, Philadelphia Eagles and St. Louis Rams | |
| Reggie Wayne | former wide receiver; Indianapolis Colts Ring of Honor, NFL receiving yards leader (2007) and 6× Pro Bowl | |
| Nate Webster | former linebacker, Cincinnati Bengals, Denver Broncos, and Tampa Bay Buccaneers | |
| Vince Wilfork | former nose tackle; New England Patriots Hall of Fame, New England Patriots All-Dynasty Team, 5× Pro Bowl and 5x All-Pro | |
| D. J. Williams | former linebacker, Chicago Bears and Denver Broncos | |
| Darryl Williams | former safety, Cincinnati Bengals and Seattle Seahawks | |
| Kevin Williams | former wide receiver and return specialist, Arizona Cardinals, Buffalo Bills, Dallas Cowboys, and San Francisco 49ers | |
| Marquez Williams | former fullback, Cleveland Browns and Jacksonville Jaguars | |
| Kellen Winslow II | former tight end, Cleveland Browns, New England Patriots, New York Jets, Seattle Seahawks, and Tampa Bay Buccaneers; Pro Bowl (2007) | |
| Eric Winston | former offensive tackle, Arizona Cardinals, Cincinnati Bengals, Houston Texans, Kansas City Chiefs, and Seattle Seahawks | |

=== Golf ===
| Alumnus | Notability | Reference |
|---|---|---|
| Woody Austin | professional golfer, PGA Tour Champions | |
| Al Besselink | former professional golfer, PGA Tour, and five-time PGA Tour and 12 professional tournament winner | |
| Nathaniel Crosby | former professional golfer and 1981 U.S. Amateur Championship and 1982 Porter Cup winner and member of winning 1982 Eisenhower Trophy and 1983 Walker Cup teams | |
| Scott Gump | former professional golfer, PGA Tour, and winner of 2004 Albertsons Boise Open | |
| Tracy Kerdyk | former professional golfer, LPGA Tour, and winner of 1995 JAL Big Apple Classic | |
| Frank Stranahan | former professional golfer, PGA Tour, and six-time PGA Tour winner | |

=== Sailing ===
| Alumnus | Notability | Reference |
|---|---|---|
| Kevin Burnham | men's Olympic gold medalist at 2004 games in Athens and Olympic silver medalist at 1992 games in Barcelona | |
| Zach Railey | men's Olympic silver medalist at 2008 games in Beijing | |

=== Soccer ===
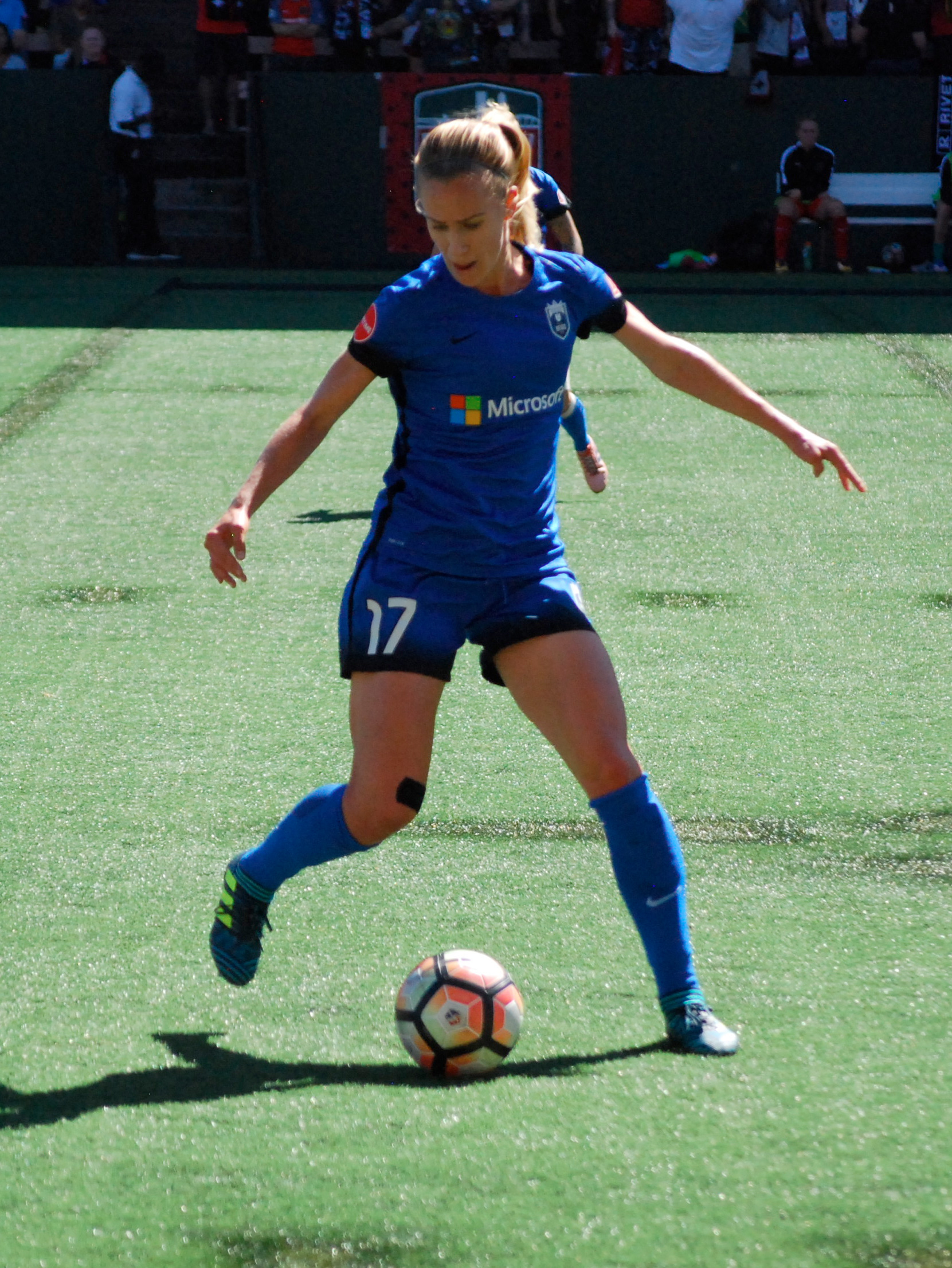
Bev Yanez

| Alumnus | Notability | Reference |
|---|---|---|
| Bev Yanez | head coach, Racing Louisville FC, and former professional soccer player for Seattle Reign FC and INAC Kobe Leonessa | |

=== Sports administration ===
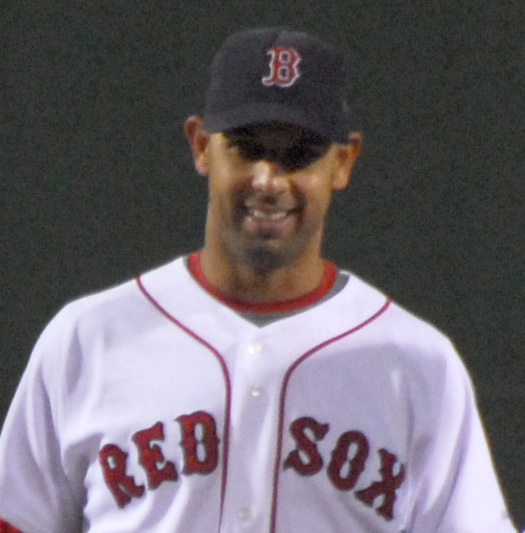
Alex Cora

| Alumnus | Notability | Reference |
|---|---|---|
| Kevin Beard | wide receivers coach, University of Miami | |
| Skip Bertman | former athletic director, Louisiana State, and member of College Baseball Hall of Fame | |
| Mel Bratton | former director of professional personnel, Washington Commanders, and former scout, Atlanta Falcons | |
| Rob Chudzinski | senior offensive analyst, Boston College | |
| Bernard Clark | head football coach, Robert Morris | |
| Julia Cohen | assistant tennis coach, Chestnut Hill College | |
| Rob Cooper | director of player development, Miami Hurricanes baseball | |
| Alex Cora | former manager, Boston Red Sox | |
| Mario Cristobal | head football coach, University of Miami | |
| Fran Curci | former head football coach, University of Tampa, University of Miami, and University of Kentucky | |
| Paul Dee | former athletic director, University of Miami | |
| Jim Dooley | former head coach, Chicago Bears | |
| Pete Garcia | former athletic director, Florida International University | |
| Trent Harris | defensive ends coach, Duke University | |
| Steve Hertz | former head baseball coach, Tel Aviv Lightning | |
| Don James | former head football coach, University of Washington and Kent State, and member of College Football Hall of Fame | |
| D'Eriq King | quarterbacks coach, SMU | |
| Willie Martinez | former cornerbacks coach, University of Tennessee | |
| Cam McCormick | scouting assistant, New England Patriots | |
| Sunny Mehta | general manager, New Jersey Devils | |
| Winston Moss | former assistant head coach, Green Bay Packers | |
| Tom Pratt | former defensive pass rush coach, Arizona Cardinals and Kansas City Chiefs | |
| Dan Radakovich | athletic director, University of Miami | |
| Ronni Reis | former head women's tennis coach, University of Michigan | |
| Mark Richt | former head football coach, University of Georgia and University of Miami, current television analyst | |
| Alfredo Roberts | former tight ends coach, New York Jets and Pittsburgh Steelers | |
| Drew Rosenhaus | National Football League professional sports agent | |
| Pat Ruel | former offensive line coach, Seattle Seahawks | |
| Randy Shannon | linebackers coach and co-defensive coordinator, Florida State | |

=== Swimming and diving ===
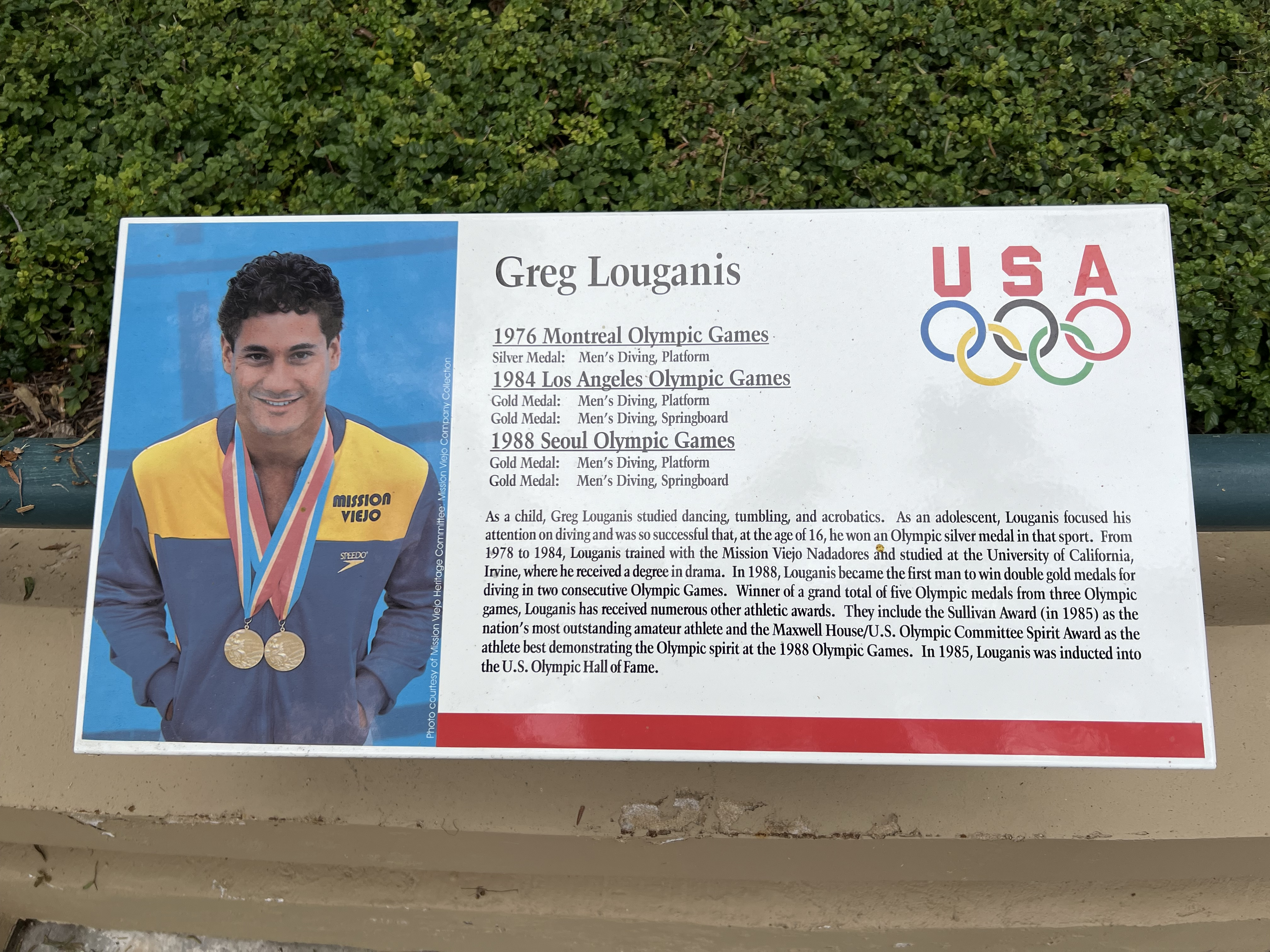
Greg Louganis

| Alumnus | Notability | Reference |
|---|---|---|
| Lawrence Frostad | 1992 1500-meter freestyle USA Olympian and five-time national swimming champion | |
| Matt Gribble | two-time U.S. Olympian and former world record holder in 100m butterfly | |
| Daphne Jongejans | three-time Olympian diver (1984, 1988, 1992) representing Netherlands | |
| Greg Louganis | four-time Olympic gold medalist and winner of 1984 James E. Sullivan Award (transferred) | |
| Reuben Ross | 2008 NCAA 3m springboard diving champion | |
| Roberto Strauss | 1972 Olympic swimmer for Mexico | |
| Jesse Vassallo | former world record holder in 200m and 400m individual medley | |
| Brittany Viola | 2008 and 2011 NCAA 10m platform diving champion | |
| David Wilkie | Olympic gold (1976) and silver (1972 and 1976) medallist, three-time NCAAA national champion and three-time world record holder | |

=== Tennis ===
==== Current players ====
| Alumnus | Notability | Reference |
|---|---|---|
| Monique Albuquerque | former Brazilian professional tennis player | |
| Maya Tahan | former Israeli tennis player | |

==== Former players ====
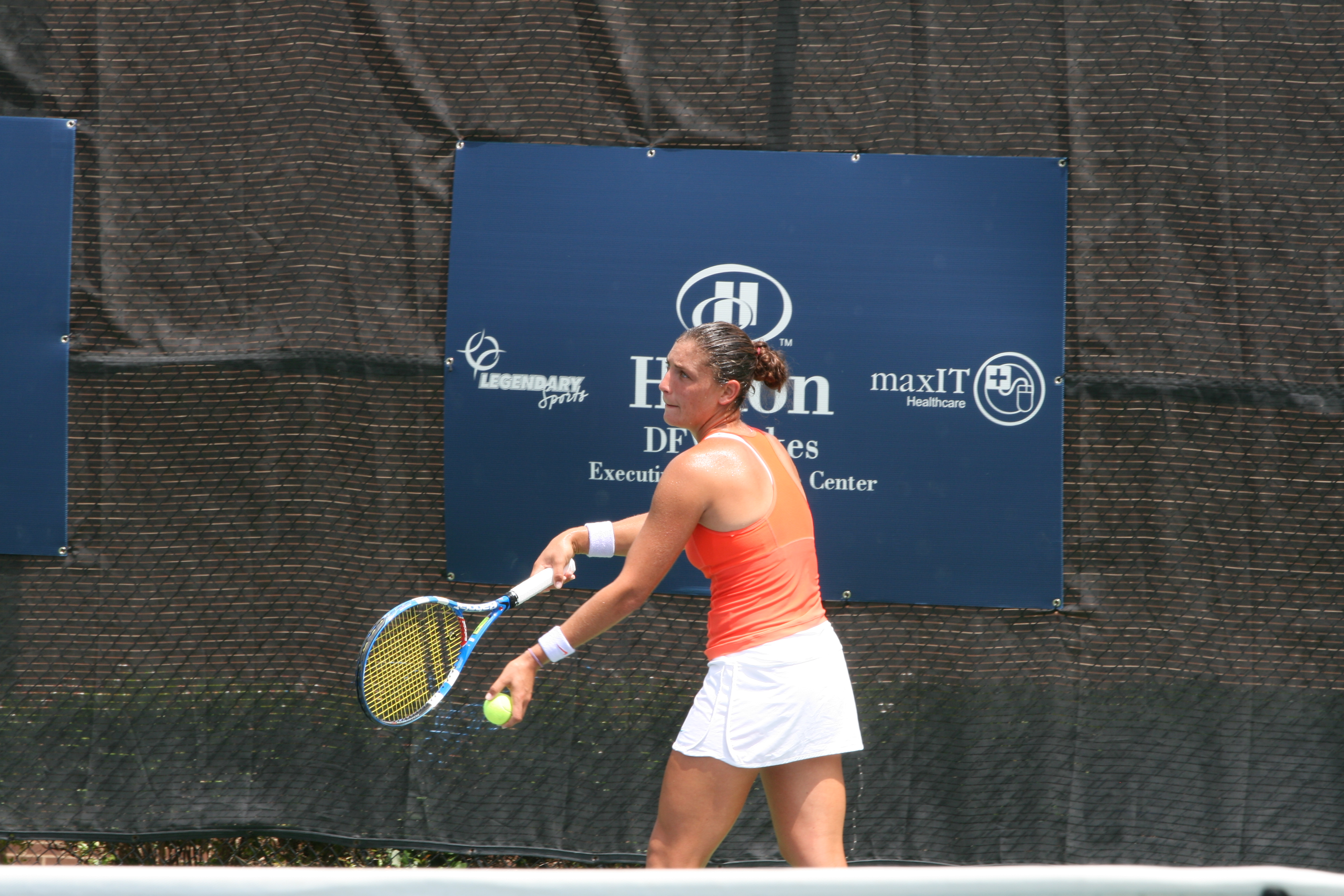
Audra Cohen

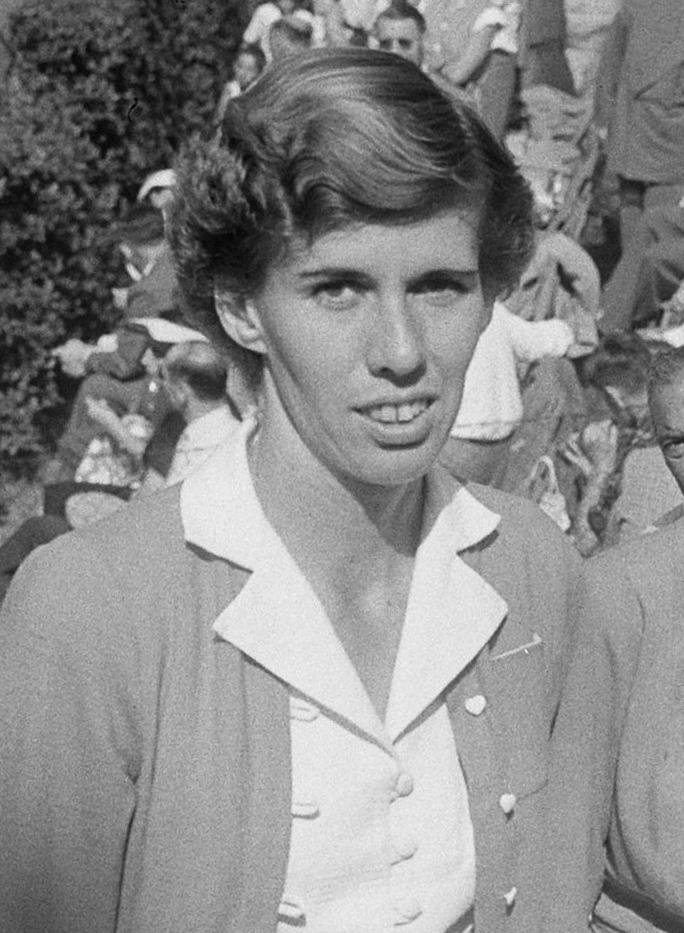
Doris Hart

| Alumnus | Notability | Reference |
|---|---|---|
| Jodi Appelbaum-Steinbauer | former four-time All-American, USTA doubles champion and professional tennis player | |
| Audra Cohen | former professional tennis player and 2007 NCAA women's singles champion | |
| Julia Cohen | former professional tennis player and former All-ACC player | |
| Doris Hart | former professional tennis player, 1951 Wimbledon champion and two-time US Open women's champion (1954 and 1955) | |
| Rod Mandelstam | 1960 Boys Wimbledon champion | |
| Gardnar Mulloy | former professional tennis player, four-time U.S. men's doubles champion (1942, 1945, 1946 and 1948), Wimbledon men's doubles champion (1957) and three-time NCAA singles champion (1943, 1944 and 1945) | |
| Ronni Reis | doubles gold medal winner of 1987 Pan American Games | |
| Ed Rubinoff | former professional tennis player | |
| Michael Russell | former professional tennis player (did not graduate) | |
| Pancho Segura | former professional tennis player, three-time NCAA men's champion (1943, 1944, and 1945) and 1952 world #1 men's player | |
| Todd Widom | former professional tennis player (did not graduate) | |

=== Track and field ===
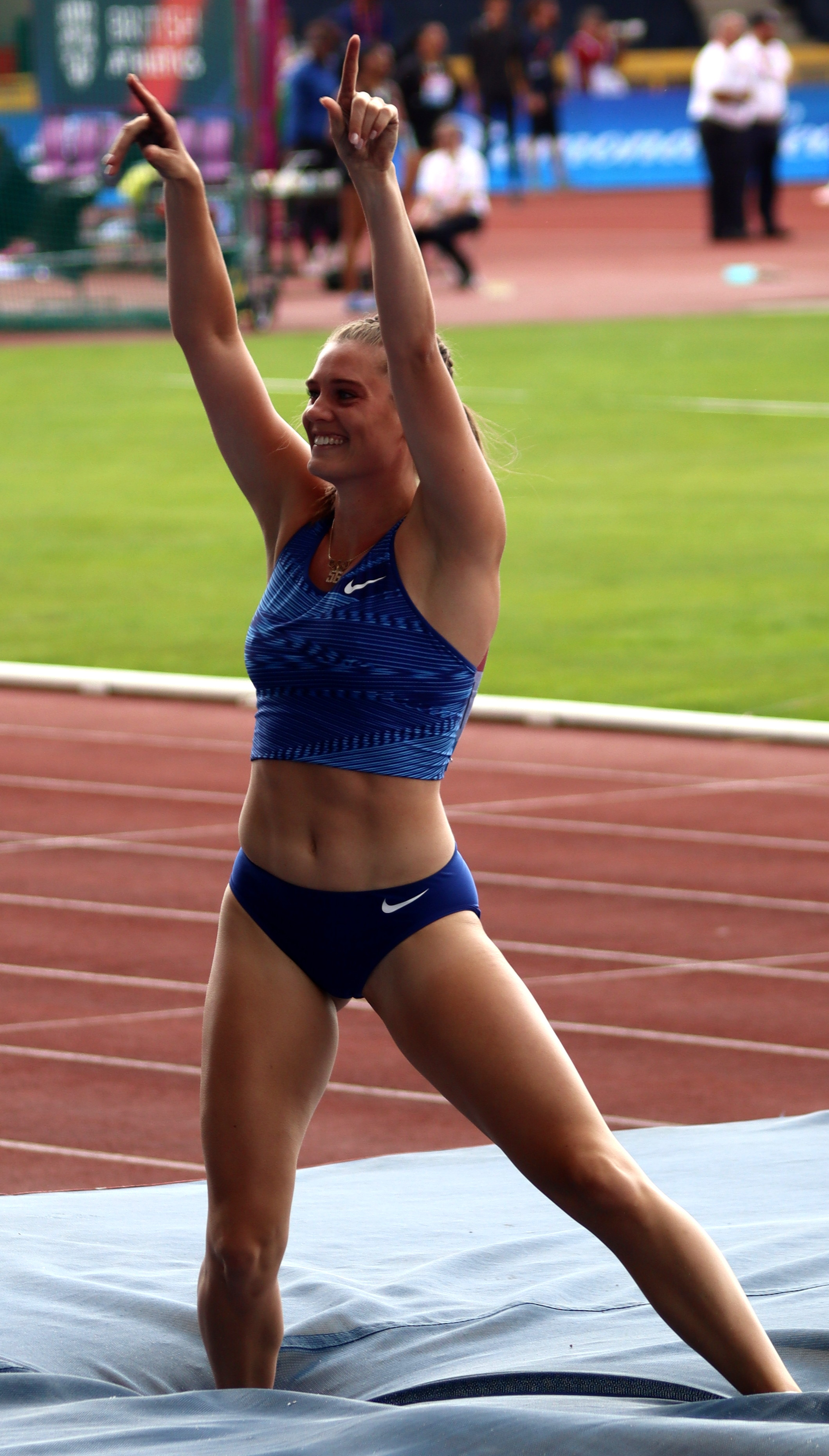
Alysha Newman

| Alumnus | Notability | Reference |
|---|---|---|
| Murielle Ahouré | double silver medalist in 100m and 200m at 2013 World Championships in Moscow (did not graduate) | |
| T'erea Brown | champion in 400mH at 2010 USA Outdoor Track and Field Championships | |
| Alysha Newman | Canadian team 2016 Summer Olympics participant in pole vault | |
| Lauryn Williams | silver medalist in 100m at 2004 Summer Olympics | |

=== Other ===
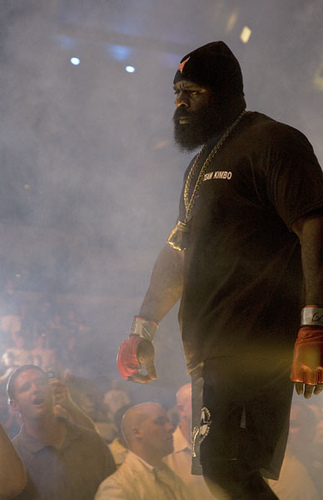
Kimbo Slice

| Alumnus | Notability | Reference |
|---|---|---|
| Haley Cavinder | social media influencer and former Miami Hurricanes women's basketball player | |
| Hanna Cavinder | social media influencer and former Miami Hurricanes women's basketball player | |
| Tim Holland | former world champion backgammon player | |
| Bruce Levine | trainer of Thoroughbred racehorses | |
| Jeff Segal | United SportsCar Championship, Rolex Sports Car Series and 24 Hours of Le Mans GT professional racing driver | |
| Kimbo Slice | former MMA fighter and boxer (did not graduate) | |
| Patrick Staropoli | NASCAR professional stock car racing driver | |
| Olga Strantzali | professional volleyball player, Panathinaikos, and member of the Greek women's national team | |
| Kay van Berlo | GT racing driver | |
