= 2018 Miami Hurricanes football team =

American college football season

2018 Miami Hurricanes football

Pinstripe Bowl, L 3–35 vs. Wisconsin
- Conference: Atlantic Coast Conference
- Coastal Division
- Record: 7–6 (4–4 ACC)
- Head coach: Mark Richt (3rd season)
- Offensive coordinator: Thomas Brown (3rd season)
- Co-offensive coordinator: Ron Dugans (1st season)
- Offensive scheme: Pro-style
- Defensive coordinator: Manny Diaz (3rd season)
- Base defense: 4–3
- Captain: Game captains
- Home stadium: Hard Rock Stadium

2018 Atlantic Coast Conference football standings
	Conf.			Overall
Team	W		L	W		L
Atlantic Division
No. 1 Clemson x$#^	8	–	0	15	–	0
No. 15 Syracuse	6	–	2	10	–	3
NC State	5	–	3	9	–	4
Boston College	4	–	4	7	–	5
Wake Forest	3	–	5	7	–	6
Florida State	3	–	5	5	–	7
Louisville	0	–	8	2	–	10
Coastal Division
Pittsburgh x	6	–	2	7	–	7
Georgia Tech	5	–	3	7	–	6
Miami (FL)	4	–	4	7	–	6
Virginia	4	–	4	8	–	5
Virginia Tech	4	–	4	6	–	7
Duke	3	–	5	8	–	5
North Carolina	1	–	7	2	–	9
Championship: Clemson 42, Pittsburgh 10
# – College Football Playoff champion; ^ – College Football Playoff participant; $ – Conference champion; x – Division champion/co-champions; Rankings from AP Poll

The 2018 Miami Hurricanes football team (variously "Miami", "The U", "UM", "'Canes") represented the University of Miami during the 2018 NCAA Division I FBS football season. The Hurricanes were led by third-year head coach Mark Richt and played their home games at Hard Rock Stadium. They competed as a member of the Coastal Division of the Atlantic Coast Conference (ACC). They finished the season 7–6, 4–4 in ACC play to finish in a 3-way tie for 3rd in the Coastal Division. They were invited to the Pinstripe Bowl where they would lose to Wisconsin.

On December 30, 2018, Richt announced his retirement after 3 seasons at Miami and 18 overall as head coach. That same day, the school named Manny Diaz as their new head coach.

== Offseason ==
=== Recruiting ===
==== Position key ====
Back	B	Center	C	Cornerback	CB	Defensive back	DB
Defensive end	DE	Defensive lineman	DL	Defensive tackle	DT	End	E
Fullback	FB	Guard	G	Halfback	HB	Kicker	K
Kickoff returner	KR	Offensive tackle	OT	Offensive lineman	OL	Linebacker	LB
Long snapper	LS	Punter	P	Punt returner	PR	Quarterback	QB
Running back	RB	Safety	S	Tight end	TE	Wide receiver	WR

==== Recruits ====
The Hurricanes signed a total of 23 recruits.

College recruiting (2018)
Name	Hometown	School	Height	Weight	Commit date
Daquris Wiggins; WR	Miami, Florida	Miami Southridge High School	6 ft 3 in (1.91 m)	175 lb (79 kg)	Oct 21, 2015
Daquris Wiggins; WR	Recruit ratings: Scout: Rivals: 247Sports: ESPN:				
Gilbert Frierson; DB	Coral Gables, Florida	Coral Gables High School	6 ft 1 in (1.85 m)	185 lb (84 kg)	Feb 23, 2016
Gilbert Frierson; DB	Recruit ratings: Scout: Rivals: 247Sports: ESPN:				
D. J. Ivey; CB	Homestead, Florida	South Dade High School	6 ft 1 in (1.85 m)	180 lb (82 kg)	Jun 25, 2016
D. J. Ivey; CB	Recruit ratings: Scout: Rivals: 247Sports: ESPN:				
Delone Scaife; OG	Miami, Florida	Miami Southridge High School	6 ft 3 in (1.91 m)	320 lb (150 kg)	Jul 9, 2016
Delone Scaife; OG	Recruit ratings: Scout: Rivals: 247Sports: ESPN:				
Lorenzo Lingard; RB	Orange City, Florida	University High School	6 ft 0 in (1.83 m)	190 lb (86 kg)	Feb 9, 2017
Lorenzo Lingard; RB	Recruit ratings: Scout: Rivals: 247Sports: ESPN:				
Nesta Jade Silvera; DT	Plantation, Florida	American Heritage School	6 ft 2 in (1.88 m)	308 lb (140 kg)	Feb 14, 2017
Nesta Jade Silvera; DT	Recruit ratings: Scout: Rivals: 247Sports: ESPN:				
Cam'Ron Davis; RB	Miami Gardens, Florida	Miami Carol City High School	5 ft 9 in (1.75 m)	187 lb (85 kg)	Feb 18, 2017
Cam'Ron Davis; RB	Recruit ratings: Scout: Rivals: 247Sports: ESPN:				
Brian Hightower; WR	Calabasas, California	IMG Academy	6 ft 3 in (1.91 m)	196 lb (89 kg)	Mar 1, 2017
Brian Hightower; WR	Recruit ratings: Scout: Rivals: 247Sports: ESPN:				
Mark Pope; WR	Miami, Florida	Miami Southridge High School	6 ft 1 in (1.85 m)	175 lb (79 kg)	Mar 27, 2017
Mark Pope; WR	Recruit ratings: Scout: Rivals: 247Sports: ESPN:				
Gurvan Hall; S	Palm Beach Gardens, Florida	Palm Beach Gardens Community High School	6 ft 1 in (1.85 m)	185 lb (84 kg)	Mar 27, 2017
Gurvan Hall; S	Recruit ratings: Scout: Rivals: 247Sports: ESPN:				
Cleveland Reed; OG	Fort Meade, Florida	Fort Meade High School	6 ft 3 in (1.91 m)	327 lb (148 kg)	Apr 5, 2017
Cleveland Reed; OG	Recruit ratings: Scout: Rivals: 247Sports: ESPN:				
Brevin Jordan; TE	Las Vegas, Nevada	Bishop Gorman High School	6 ft 3 in (1.91 m)	250 lb (110 kg)	Apr 16, 2017
Brevin Jordan; TE	Recruit ratings: Scout: Rivals: 247Sports: ESPN:				
Will Mallory; TE	Jacksonville, Florida	Providence School	6 ft 5 in (1.96 m)	207 lb (94 kg)	Apr 21, 2017
Will Mallory; TE	Recruit ratings: Scout: Rivals: 247Sports: ESPN:				
Gregory Rousseau; DE	Miami, Florida	Champagnat Catholic School	6 ft 6 in (1.98 m)	222 lb (101 kg)	Apr 22, 2017
Gregory Rousseau; DE	Recruit ratings: Scout: Rivals: 247Sports: ESPN:				
Bubba Baxa; K	Pasadena, Texas	Pasadena Memorial High School	6 ft 0 in (1.83 m)	195 lb (88 kg)	May 27, 2017
Bubba Baxa; K	Recruit ratings: Scout: Rivals: 247Sports: ESPN:				
Al Blades Jr. CB	Fort Lauderdale, Florida	St. Thomas Aquinas High School	6 ft 0 in (1.83 m)	170 lb (77 kg)	Jun 18, 2017
Al Blades Jr. CB	Recruit ratings: Scout: Rivals: 247Sports: ESPN:				
John Campbell; OT	Orlando, Florida	Dr. Phillips High School	6 ft 5 in (1.96 m)	284 lb (129 kg)	Jul 3, 2017
John Campbell; OT	Recruit ratings: Scout: Rivals: 247Sports: ESPN:				
Realus George; FB	Pace Academy	Atlanta, Georgia	6 ft 2 in (1.88 m)	245 lb (111 kg)	Nov 12, 2017
Realus George; FB	Recruit ratings: Scout: Rivals: 247Sports: ESPN:				
Patrick Joyner; DE	Homestead, Florida	South Dade High School	6 ft 2 in (1.88 m)	205 lb (93 kg)	Dec 3, 2017
Patrick Joyner; DE	Recruit ratings: Scout: Rivals: 247Sports: ESPN:				
Jarren Williams; QB	Lawrenceville, Georgia	Central Gwinnett High School	6 ft 2 in (1.88 m)	206 lb (93 kg)	Dec 6, 2017
Jarren Williams; QB	Recruit ratings: Scout: Rivals: 247Sports: ESPN:				
Nigel Bethel; CB	Miami, Florida	Miami Northwestern High School	5 ft 11 in (1.80 m)	160 lb (73 kg)	Jan 22, 2018
Nigel Bethel; CB	Recruit ratings: Scout: Rivals: 247Sports: ESPN:				
Jordan Miller; DT	Jacksonville, Florida	Sandalwood High School	6 ft 4 in (1.93 m)	330 lb (150 kg)	Jan 29, 2018
Jordan Miller; DT	Recruit ratings: Scout: Rivals: 247Sports: ESPN:				
Marquez Ezzard; WR	Stockbridge, Georgia	Stockbridge High School	6 ft 1 in (1.85 m)	220 lb (100 kg)	Feb 7, 2018
Marquez Ezzard; WR	Recruit ratings: Scout: Rivals: 247Sports: ESPN:				
Overall recruit ranking:
Note: In many cases, Scout, Rivals, 247Sports, On3, and ESPN may conflict in their listings of height and weight.; In these cases, the average was taken. ESPN grades are on a 100-point scale.; Sources: "Miami Football Commitments". Rivals.; "2018 Team Ranking". Rivals.com.

== Preseason ==
=== Award watch lists ===
Award	Player	Position	Year
Lott Trophy	Joe Jackson	DE	JR
Rimington Trophy	Tyler Gauthier	C	SR
Chuck Bednarik Award	Shaquille Quarterman	LB	JR
Chuck Bednarik Award	Jaquan Johnson	DB	SR
Maxwell Award	Travis Homer	RB	JR
Maxwell Award	Ahmmon Richards	WR	JR
Doak Walker Award	Travis Homer	RB	JR
Fred Biletnikoff Award	Ahmmon Richards	WR	JR
Butkus Award	Shaquille Quarterman	LB	JR
Jim Thorpe Award	Michael Jackson	DB	SR
Jim Thorpe Award	Jaquan Johnson	DB	SR
Bronko Nagurski Trophy	Michael Jackson	DB	SR
Bronko Nagurski Trophy	Jaquan Johnson	DB	SR
Bronko Nagurski Trophy	Shaquille Quarterman	LB	JR
Outland Trophy	Tyler Gauthier	C	SR
Wuerffel Trophy	Demetrius Jackson	DL	SR
Walter Camp Award	Jaquan Johnson	DB	SR
Walter Camp Award	Ahmmon Richards	WR	JR
Ted Hendricks Award	Joe Jackson	DE	JR
Johnny Unitas Golden Arm Award	Malik Rosier	QB	SR
Manning Award	Malik Rosier	QB	SR

=== ACC media poll ===
The ACC media poll was released on July 24, 2018.

Media poll (Coastal)
Predicted finish	Team	Votes (1st place)
1	Miami	998 (122)
2	Virginia Tech	838 (16)
3	Georgia Tech	654 (8)
4	Duke	607 (1)
5	Pittsburgh	420
6	North Carolina	370 (1)
7	Virginia	257

== Schedule ==
Date	Time	Opponent	Rank	Site	TV	Result	Attendance
September 2	7:30 p.m.	vs. No. 25 LSU*	No. 8	AT&T Stadium; Arlington, TX (Advocare Classic)	ABC	L 17–33	68,841
September 8	6:00 p.m.	Savannah State*	No. 22	Hard Rock Stadium; Miami Gardens, FL	ACCN Extra	W 77–0	60,307
September 15	12:00 p.m.	at Toledo*	No. 21	Glass Bowl; Toledo, OH	ESPN2	W 49–24	28,117
September 22	3:30 p.m.	FIU*	No. 21	Hard Rock Stadium; Miami Gardens, FL	ESPN2	W 31–17	59,814
September 27	8:00 p.m.	North Carolina	No. 16	Hard Rock Stadium; Miami Gardens, FL	ESPN	W 47–10	60,845
October 6	3:30 p.m.	Florida State	No. 17	Hard Rock Stadium; Miami Gardens, FL (rivalry)	ABC	W 28–27	65,490
October 13	7:00 p.m.	at Virginia	No. 16	Scott Stadium; Charlottesville, VA	ESPN2	L 13–16	42,393
October 26	7:00 p.m.	at Boston College		Alumni Stadium; Chestnut Hill, MA	ESPN	L 14–27	44,514
November 3	7:00 p.m.	Duke^{†}		Hard Rock Stadium; Miami Gardens, FL	ESPN2	L 12–20	62,754
November 10	7:00 p.m.	at Georgia Tech		Bobby Dodd Stadium; Atlanta, GA	ESPN2	L 21–27	48,217
November 17	3:30 p.m.	at Virginia Tech		Lane Stadium; Blacksburg, VA (rivalry)	ESPN	W 38–14	62,379
November 24	3:30 p.m.	No. 24 Pittsburgh		Hard Rock Stadium; Miami Gardens, FL	ESPN	W 24–3	59,606
December 27	5:15 p.m.	vs. Wisconsin*		Yankee Stadium; Bronx, NY (New Era Pinstripe Bowl)	ESPN	L 3–35	37,821
*Non-conference game; ^{†}Homecoming; Rankings from AP Poll released prior to the game; All times are in Eastern time

== Roster ==
2018 Miami Hurricanes football team roster
Players
Coaches
Offense

Pos.	#	Name	Class
QB	5	N'Kosi Perry	Fr
QB	16	Ryan Rizk	Fr
QB	12	Malik Rosier	Sr
QB	17	Cade Weldon	Fr
QB	15	Jarren Williams	Fr
RB	28	Crispian Atkins	Jr
RB	36	Steven Billings-Larson Jr.	Fr
RB	22	Robert Burns	Fr
RB	13	DeeJay Dallas	So
RB	23	Cam'Ron Davis	Fr
RB	32	Trayone Gray	Sr
RB	24	Travis Homer	Jr
RB	1	Lorenzo Lingard	Fr
FB	38	Danny Dominguez	Sr
FB	44	Realus George Jr.	Fr
FB	41	Michael Parrott	So
WR	29	Chad Allen	Sr
WR	48	Evan Brunelle	Fr
WR	18	Lawrence Cager	Jr
WR	11	Marquez Ezzard	Fr
WR	27	Marshall Few	So
WR	3	Mike Harley Jr.	So
WR	7	Brian Hightower	Fr
WR	40	Will Huggins	Fr
WR	81	Darrell Langham	Sr
WR	34	Elias Lugo-Fagundo	Fr
WR	43	Brian Miller	Fr
WR	83	Evidence Njoku	Fr
WR	6	Mark Pope	Fr
WR	82	Ahmmon Richards	Jr
WR	4	Jeff Thomas	So
WR	8	Dee Wiggins	Fr
TE	46	Nicholas Ducheine	So
TE	87	Michael Irvin II	Jr
TE	9	Brevin Jordan	Fr
TE	85	Will Mallory	Fr
TE	88	Brian Polendey	So
OL	50	Venzell Boulware	Jr
OL	70	George Brown Jr.	Jr
OL	72	John Campbell Jr.	Fr
OL	55	Navaughn Donaldson	So
OL	67	Zach Dykstra	Fr
OL	74	Tyler Gauthier	Sr
OL	65	Corey Gaynor	So
OL	54	Devin Golden	Fr
OL	71	Jared Griffith	Fr
OL	57	Kai-Leon Herbert	So
OL	75	Zalon'tae Hillery	Fr
OL	77	Jahair Jones	Sr
OL	68	Zachary Lerman	Fr
OL	62	Hayden Mahoney	Jr
OL	79	Bar Milo	Jr
OL	51	DJ Scaife Jr.	Fr
OL	78	Tyree St. Louis	Sr
OL	52	Cleveland Reed Jr.	Fr

Defense

Pos.	#	Name	Class
DL	93	Pat Bethel	Jr
DL	96	Jonathan Ford	So
DL	97	Jonathan Garvin	So
DL	31	Demetrius Jackson	Sr
DL	99	Joe Jackson	Jr
DL	90	Tyreic Martin	So
DL	91	Jordan Miller	Fr
DL	95	John O'Boyle	Sr
DL	94	Tito Odenigbo	Sr
DL	19	Scott Patchan	Jr
DL	15	Gregory Rousseau	Fr
DL	68	Michael Scibelli	Fr
DL	1	Nesta Jade Silvera	Fr
DL	9	Gerald Willis	Sr
LB	48	Thomas Burns	Fr
LB	44	Bradley Jennings Jr.	So
LB	52	Patrick Joyner Jr.	Fr
LB	53	Zach McCloud	Jr
LB	23	Terry McCray	Sr
LB	56	Michael Pinckney	Jr
LB	55	Shaquille Quarterman	Jr
LB	35	Mike Smith	Sr
LB	17	Waynmon Steed	Fr
LB	41	Darian Stephenson	Fr
LB	49	Shawn Walker	So
LB	11	De'Andre Wilder	So
DB	37	Colvin Alford	Fr
DB	2	Trajan Bandy	So
DB	27	Nigel Bethel Jr.	Fr
DB	7	Al Blades Jr.	Fr
DB	5	Amari Carter	So
DB	6	Jhavonte Dean	Sr
DB	30	Romeo Finley	Jr
DB	3	Gilbert Frierson	Fr
DB	26	Gurvan Hall Jr.	Fr
DB	8	D. J. Ivey	Fr
DB	28	Michael Jackson Sr.	Sr
DB	4	Jaquan Johnson	Sr
DB	20	Robert Knowles	Jr
DB	32	Tyler Murphy	Sr
DB	22	Sheldrick Redwine	Sr
DB	25	Derrick Smith	So

Special teams

Pos.	#	Name	Class
K	85	Marco Baeza	Sr
K	21	Bubba Baxa	Fr
K	98	Suleman Burrows	Fr
K	92	Alejandro Cardenas	Sr
K	47	Turner Davidson	Fr
K	45	Camden Price	Fr
P	16	Zach Feagles	So
P	43	Jack Spicer	Jr
LS	39	Jordan Butler	Sr
LS	58	Clay James	Jr
LS	61	Jacob Munoz	So
LS	59	Sam York	Sr

Head coach

- Mark Richt

Coordinators/assistant coaches

- Manny Diaz (DC)

Legend

- (C) Team captain
- (S) Suspended
- (I) Ineligible
- Injured
- Redshirt

== Game summaries ==
=== vs LSU ===
	1	2	3	4	Total
No. 8 Hurricanes	3	0	0	14	17
No. 25 Tigers	10	17	6	0	33

=== Savannah State ===
	1	2	3	4	Total
Tigers	0	0	0	0	0
No. 22 Hurricanes	7	21	21	28	77

=== At Toledo ===
	1	2	3	4	Total
No. 21 Hurricanes	7	14	14	14	49
Rockets	0	7	14	3	24

=== FIU ===
	1	2	3	4	Total
Panthers	0	0	0	17	17
No. 21 Hurricanes	7	17	7	0	31

=== North Carolina ===
	1	2	3	4	Total
Tar Heels	10	0	0	0	10
No. 16 Hurricanes	14	19	0	14	47

=== Florida State ===
	1	2	3	4	Total
Seminoles	7	13	7	0	27
No. 17 Hurricanes	0	7	14	7	28

=== At Virginia ===
	1	2	3	4	Total
No. 16 Hurricanes	0	6	0	7	13
Cavaliers	0	13	0	3	16

=== At Boston College ===
	1	2	3	4	Total
Hurricanes	7	7	0	0	14
Eagles	14	3	10	0	27

=== Duke ===
	1	2	3	4	Total
Blue Devils	7	0	10	3	20
Hurricanes	0	12	0	0	12

=== At Georgia Tech ===
	1	2	3	4	Total
Hurricanes	7	7	0	7	21
Yellow Jackets	14	3	10	0	27

=== At Virginia Tech ===
	1	2	3	4	Total
Hurricanes	3	14	21	0	38
Hokies	7	7	0	0	14

=== Pittsburgh ===
	1	2	3	4	Total
No. 24 Panthers	0	0	3	0	3
Hurricanes	3	7	7	7	24

=== Vs. Wisconsin (Pinstripe Bowl) ===
	1	2	3	4	Total
Badgers	14	0	7	14	35
Hurricanes	3	0	0	0	3

== Rankings ==
Ranking movements Legend: ██ Increase in ranking ██ Decrease in ranking — = Not ranked RV = Received votes
	Week															
Poll	Pre	1	2	3	4	5	6	7	8	9	10	11	12	13	14	Final
AP	8	22	21	21	16	17	16	RV	RV	—	—	—	—	—	—	
Coaches	8	21	20	20	16	17	15	RV	25	RV	—	—	—	—	—	
CFP	Not released									—	—	—	—	—	—	Not released

== 2019 NFL draft ==
Round	Pick	Player	Position	NFL Club
4	119	Sheldrick Redwine	S	Cleveland Browns
5	158	Michael Jackson	CB	Dallas Cowboys
5	165	Joe Jackson	DE	Dallas Cowboys
6	181	Jaquan Johnson	S	Buffalo Bills
6	204	Travis Homer	RB	Seattle Seahawks
