= 2017 Miami Hurricanes football team =

American college football season

2017 Miami Hurricanes football

ACC Coastal Division champion

ACC Championship Game, L 3–38 vs. Clemson

Orange Bowl, L 24–34 vs. Wisconsin
- Conference: Atlantic Coast Conference
- Coastal Division

Ranking
- Coaches: No. 13
- AP: No. 13
- Record: 10–3 (7–1 ACC)
- Head coach: Mark Richt (2nd season)
- Offensive coordinator: Thomas Brown (2nd season)
- Offensive scheme: Pro-style
- Defensive coordinator: Manny Diaz (2nd season)
- Base defense: 4–3
- Captain: Game captains
- Home stadium: Hard Rock Stadium

2017 Atlantic Coast Conference football standings
	Conf.			Overall
Team	W		L	W		L
Atlantic Division
No. 4 Clemson xy$^	7	–	1	12	–	2
No. 23 NC State	6	–	2	9	–	4
Wake Forest	4	–	4	8	–	5
Louisville	4	–	4	8	–	5
Boston College	4	–	4	7	–	6
Florida State	3	–	5	7	–	6
Syracuse	2	–	6	4	–	8
Coastal Division
No. 13 Miami (FL) xy	7	–	1	10	–	3
No. 24 Virginia Tech	5	–	3	9	–	4
Georgia Tech	4	–	4	5	–	6
Virginia	3	–	5	6	–	7
Pittsburgh	3	–	5	5	–	7
Duke	3	–	5	7	–	6
North Carolina	1	–	7	3	–	9
Championship: Clemson 38, Miami 3
^ – College Football Playoff participant; $ – Conference champion; x – Division champion/co-champions; y – Championship game participant; Rankings from AP Poll

The 2017 Miami Hurricanes football team represented the University of Miami during the 2017 NCAA Division I FBS football season. It was the Hurricanes' 92nd season of football and 14th as a member of the Atlantic Coast Conference. The Hurricanes were led by second-year head coach Mark Richt and played their home games at Hard Rock Stadium. They finished the season 10–3 overall and 7–1 in the ACC to finish in first in the Coastal Division. They advanced to the ACC Championship Game where they lost to Clemson, 38–3. They were invited to the Orange Bowl where they lost to Wisconsin, 34–24.

== Turnover Chain ==
Before the season Diaz suggested rewarding defensive players who recover fumbles or interceptions. Jeweler AJ "King of Bling" Machado created the Turnover Chain—a 36-inch, 5-5 pound, 10-karat gold Cuban link necklace with a large "U" charm covered with orange and green sapphires—in August 2017. Its gaudiness amazed the team and coaching staff, with one saying that "it's supposed to be larger than life".

ESPN described the chain as "quintessential Miami: flashy, swaggy, in your face, loud and flamboyant". Malek Young became the first to wear the chain, after intercepting a Bethune-Cookman pass in the end zone. Counterfeit shirts depicting the chain became available for sale within a week. Richt said, "It's good, clean fun. If we were 4-5 and had six turnovers, I think people would probably make fun of it. But when you win, things become cool sometimes".

== Personnel ==
=== Coaching staff ===
Name	Position	Seasons	Alma mater
Mark Richt	Head coach	2nd	Miami (1982)
Manny Diaz	Defensive coordinator/linebackers	2nd	Florida State (1995)
Thomas Brown	Offensive coordinator/running backs	2nd	Georgia (2008)
Craig Kuligowski	Defensive line	2nd	Toledo (1991)
Jon Richt	Quarterbacks	2nd	Mars Hill (2012)
Ron Dugans	Wide receivers	2nd	Florida State (2002)
Stacy Searels	Offensive line	2nd	Auburn (1990)
Todd Hartley	Special teams coordinator/tight ends	2nd	Georgia (2008)
Mike Rumph	Cornerbacks	2nd	Miami (2002)
Ephraim Banda	Safeties	2nd	Incarnate Word (2004)

=== Support staff ===
Name	Position	Seasons	Alma mater
Gus Felder	Strength and Conditioning	2nd	Penn State (2002)
Alex Devine	Graduate assistant	2nd	Mississippi State (2015)
Matthew Gazzillo	Graduate assistant	1st	Florida State (2014)

== Roster ==
2017 Miami Hurricanes football team roster
Players
Coaches
Offense

Pos.	#	Name	Class
RB	1	Mark Walton	Jr
WR	3	Mike Harley Jr.	Fr
WR	4	Jeff Thomas	Fr
QB	5	N'Kosi Perry	Fr
WR	8	Braxton Berrios	Sr
QB	12	Malik Rosier	Jr
ATH	13	DeeJay Dallas	Fr
QB	16	Evan Shirreffs	So
QB	17	Cade Weldon	Fr
WR	18	Lawrence Cager	So
QB	19	Augie DeBiase	Fr
WR	21	Malik Mayweather	Sr
RB	22	Robert Burns	Fr
TE	23	Chris Herndon	Sr
RB	24	Travis Homer	So
WR	27	Marshall Few	Fr
RB	28	Crispian Atkins	So
WR	29	Chad Allen	So
RB	32	Trayone Gray	Jr
WR	34	Elias Lugo-Fagundo	Fr
FB	37	Cesar Castillo	Jr
FB	38	Danny Dominguez	Jr
FB	41	Michael Parrott	Fr
FB	45	Jack Pope	Jr
TE	46	Nicholas Ducheine	Fr
WR	48	Calvin Carrie	Fr
RB	49	Jimmy Murray	So
OL	52	K. C. McDermott	Sr
OL	55	Navaughn Donaldson	Fr
OL	57	Kai-Leon Herbert	Fr
OL	59	Justin Goldberg	Jr
OL	62	Hayden Mahoney	So
OL	65	Corey Gaynor	Fr
OL	67	Zach Dykstra	Fr
OL	68	Zachary Lerman	Fr
OL	70	George Brown Jr.	So
OL	73	Trevor Darling	Sr
OL	74	Tyler Gauthier	Jr
OL	75	Zalon'Tae Hillery	Fr
OL	76	Tre Johnson	Fr
OL	77	Jahair Jones	Jr
OL	78	Tyree St. Louis	Jr
OL	79	Bar Milo	So
WR	80	Dayall Harris	Jr
WR	81	Darrell Langham	Jr
WR	82	Ahmmon Richards	So
WR	83	Evidence Njoku	Fr
TE	86	Malik Curry	So
TE	87	Michael Irvin II	So
TE	88	Brian Polendey	Fr

Defense

Pos.	#	Name	Class
DL	1	D. J. Johnson	Fr
DB	2	Trajan Bandy	Fr
DB	3	Dee Delaney	Sr
DB	4	Jaquan Johnson	Jr
DB	5	Amari Carter	Fr
DB	6	Jhavonte Dean	Jr
DL	7	Kendrick Norton	Jr
DL	9	Chad Thomas	Sr
LB	11	De'Andre Wilder	Fr
DB	12	Malek Young	So
LB	17	Waynmon Steed	Fr
DL	19	Scott Patchan	So
DB	20	Robert Knowles	So
DB	22	Sheldrick Redwine	Jr
LB	23	Terry McCray	Jr
DB	25	Derrick Smith	Fr
DB	28	Mike Jackson Sr.	Jr
DB	30	Romeo Finley	So
DL	31	Demetrius Jackson	Jr
DB	32	Tyler Murphy	Jr
DL	33	Trent Harris	Sr
LB	34	Charles Perry	Jr
LB/FB	35	Mike Smith	Jr
DB	36	Teddy Stavetski	Jr
DB	37	Colvin Alford	Fr
LB	44	Bradley Jennings Jr.	Fr
DB	46	Daniel Ferguson-McAllister	So
LB/FB	47	Dewayne Washington II	Fr
LB	48	Thomas Burns	Fr
LB	49	Shawn Walker	Fr
LB	52	Jamie Gordinier	So
LB	53	Zach McCloud	So
LB	55	Shaquille Quarterman	So
LB	56	Michael Pinckney	So
LB	58	Darrion Owens	Jr
DL	80	R. J. McIntosh	Jr
DL	90	Tyreic Martin	Fr
DL	91	Gerald Willis	Jr
DL	93	Pat Bethel	So
DL	94	Ryan Fines	So
DL	95	Anthony Moten	Sr
DL	96	Jonathan Ford	Fr
DL	97	Jonathan Garvin	Fr
DL	99	Joe Jackson	So

Special teams

Pos.	#	Name	Class
K/P	15	Michael Badgley	Sr
P	18	Zach Feagles	Fr
LS	39	Jordan Butler	Jr
P	43	Jack Spicer	So
K	47	Turner Davidson	Fr
LS	50	Sam York	Jr
LS	61	Jacob Munoz	Fr
K	85	Marco Baeza	So
K	98	Diego Marquez	Sr

Head coach

- Mark Richt

Coordinators/assistant coaches

Legend

- (C) Team captain
- (S) Suspended
- (I) Ineligible
- Injured
- Redshirt

Roster

== Recruiting ==
=== Position key ===
Back	B	Center	C	Cornerback	CB	Defensive back	DB
Defensive end	DE	Defensive lineman	DL	Defensive tackle	DT	End	E
Fullback	FB	Guard	G	Halfback	HB	Kicker	K
Kickoff returner	KR	Offensive tackle	OT	Offensive lineman	OL	Linebacker	LB
Long snapper	LS	Punter	P	Punt returner	PR	Quarterback	QB
Running back	RB	Safety	S	Tight end	TE	Wide receiver	WR

=== Recruits ===
The Hurricanes signed a total of 24 recruits.

College recruiting (2017)
Name	Hometown	School	Height	Weight	Commit date
Robert Burns; RB	Miami, Florida	Gulliver Prep	5 ft 11 in (1.80 m)	209 lb (95 kg)	Feb 23, 2015
Robert Burns; RB	Recruit ratings: Scout: Rivals: 247Sports: ESPN:				
Waynmon Steed; LB	Miami, Florida	Miami Central HS	6 ft 0 in (1.83 m)	221 lb (100 kg)	Feb 28, 2015
Waynmon Steed; LB	Recruit ratings: Scout: Rivals: 247Sports: ESPN:				
Navaughn Donaldson; OT	Miami, Florida	Miami Central HS	6 ft 5 in (1.96 m)	336 lb (152 kg)	Jul 26, 2015
Navaughn Donaldson; OT	Recruit ratings: Scout: Rivals: 247Sports: ESPN:				
Jonathan Ford; DT	Fort Lauderdale, Florida	Dillard HS	6 ft 5 in (1.96 m)	275 lb (125 kg)	Jan 30, 2016
Jonathan Ford; DT	Recruit ratings: Scout: Rivals: 247Sports: ESPN:				
N'Kosi Perry; QB	Ocala, Florida	Vanguard HS	6 ft 4 in (1.93 m)	178 lb (81 kg)	Mar 19, 2016
N'Kosi Perry; QB	Recruit ratings: Scout: Rivals: 247Sports: ESPN:				
Brian Polendey; TE	Denton, Texas	Guyer HS	6 ft 5 in (1.96 m)	230 lb (100 kg)	Mar 21, 2016
Brian Polendey; TE	Recruit ratings: Scout: Rivals: 247Sports: ESPN:				
Cade Weldon; QB	Tampa, Florida	Jefferson HS	6 ft 2 in (1.88 m)	209 lb (95 kg)	Mar 21, 2016
Cade Weldon; QB	Recruit ratings: Scout: Rivals: 247Sports: ESPN:				
Zach Dykstra; OT	Spirit Lake, Iowa	Spirit Lake HS	6 ft 6 in (1.98 m)	290 lb (130 kg)	Apr 11, 2016
Zach Dykstra; OT	Recruit ratings: Scout: Rivals: 247Sports: ESPN:				
DeeJay Dallas; WR	Brunswick, Georgia	Glynn Academy	6 ft 0 in (1.83 m)	182 lb (83 kg)	May 21, 2016
DeeJay Dallas; WR	Recruit ratings: Scout: Rivals: 247Sports: ESPN:				
Zach Feagles; P	Glen Rock, New Jersey	Ridgewood HS	6 ft 2 in (1.88 m)	210 lb (95 kg)	Jun 28, 2016
Zach Feagles; P	Recruit ratings: Scout: Rivals: 247Sports: ESPN:				
Zalon'tae Hillery; OT	Brunswick, Georgia	Glynn Academy	6 ft 6 in (1.98 m)	280 lb (130 kg)	Jul 16, 2016
Zalon'tae Hillery; OT	Recruit ratings: Scout: Rivals: 247Sports: ESPN:				
Evidence Njoku; WR	Wayne, New Jersey	Wayne Hills HS	6 ft 5 in (1.96 m)	200 lb (91 kg)	Jul 18, 2016
Evidence Njoku; WR	Recruit ratings: Scout: Rivals: 247Sports: ESPN:				
D. J. Johnson; DE	Sacramento, California	Luther Burbank HS	6 ft 5 in (1.96 m)	240 lb (110 kg)	Jul 25, 2016
D. J. Johnson; DE	Recruit ratings: Scout: Rivals: 247Sports: ESPN:				
Bradley Jennings Jr. LB	Jacksonville, Florida	Sandalwood HS	6 ft 2 in (1.88 m)	218 lb (99 kg)	Jul 20, 2016
Bradley Jennings Jr. LB	Recruit ratings: Scout: Rivals: 247Sports: ESPN:				
Jonathan Garvin; DE	Lake Worth, Florida	Lake Worth HS	6 ft 4 in (1.93 m)	223 lb (101 kg)	Aug 8, 2016
Jonathan Garvin; DE	Recruit ratings: Scout: Rivals: 247Sports: ESPN:				
Trajan Brandy; CB	Miami, Florida	Columbus HS	5 ft 10 in (1.78 m)	180 lb (82 kg)	Aug 8, 2016
Trajan Brandy; CB	Recruit ratings: Scout: Rivals: 247Sports: ESPN:				
Amari Carter; S	Palm Beach Gardens, Florida	Palm Beach Gardens HS	6 ft 2 in (1.88 m)	188 lb (85 kg)	Oct 22, 2016
Amari Carter; S	Recruit ratings: Scout: Rivals: 247Sports: ESPN:				
De'Andre Wilder; LB	Miami, Florida	Carol City HS	6 ft 2 in (1.88 m)	197 lb (89 kg)	Nov 3, 2016
De'Andre Wilder; LB	Recruit ratings: Scout: Rivals: 247Sports: ESPN:				
Corey Gaynor; C	Parkland, Florida	Stoneman Douglas HS	6 ft 4 in (1.93 m)	282 lb (128 kg)	Nov 29, 2016
Corey Gaynor; C	Recruit ratings: Scout: Rivals: 247Sports: ESPN:				
Derrick Smith; WR	Jacksonville, Florida	Trinity Christian Academy	6 ft 3 in (1.91 m)	190 lb (86 kg)	Dec 13, 2016
Derrick Smith; WR	Recruit ratings: Scout: Rivals: 247Sports: ESPN:				
Kai-Leon Herbert; OT	Fort Lauderdale, Florida	American Heritage School	6 ft 5 in (1.96 m)	284 lb (129 kg)	Jan 25, 2017
Kai-Leon Herbert; OT	Recruit ratings: Scout: Rivals: 247Sports: ESPN:				
Jhavonte Dean; CB	Florida City, Florida	Blinn College	6 ft 2 in (1.88 m)	180 lb (82 kg)	Jan 31, 2017
Jhavonte Dean; CB	Recruit ratings: Scout: Rivals: 247Sports: ESPN:				
Mike Harley Jr. WR	Fort Lauderdale, Florida	St. Thomas Aquinas HS	5 ft 9 in (1.75 m)	155 lb (70 kg)	Feb 1, 2017
Mike Harley Jr. WR	Recruit ratings: Scout: Rivals: 247Sports: ESPN:				
Jeff Thomas; WR	East St. Louis, Illinois	East St. Louis HS	5 ft 10 in (1.78 m)	175 lb (79 kg)	Feb 1, 2017
Jeff Thomas; WR	Recruit ratings: Scout: Rivals: 247Sports: ESPN:				
Overall recruit ranking:
Note: In many cases, Scout, Rivals, 247Sports, On3, and ESPN may conflict in their listings of height and weight.; In these cases, the average was taken. ESPN grades are on a 100-point scale.; Sources: "Miami Football Commitments". Rivals.; "2017 Miami Football Commits". Scout.; "ESPN". ESPN.; "Scout.com Team Recruiting Rankings". Scout.; "2017 Team Ranking". Rivals.com.

== Schedule ==
Date	Time	Opponent	Rank	Site	TV	Result	Attendance
September 2	12:30 p.m.	Bethune–Cookman*	No. 18	Hard Rock Stadium; Miami Gardens, FL	ACCRSN	W 41–13	50,454
September 23	3:30 p.m.	Toledo*	No. 14	Hard Rock Stadium; Miami Gardens, FL	ACCRSN	W 52–30	49,361
September 29	7:00 p.m.	at Duke	No. 14	Wallace Wade Stadium; Durham, NC	ESPN	W 31–6	36,314
October 7^{[b]}	3:30 p.m.	at Florida State	No. 13	Doak Campbell Stadium; Tallahassee, FL (rivalry)	ESPN	W 24–20	78,169
October 14^{[c]}	3:30 p.m.	Georgia Tech	No. 11	Hard Rock Stadium; Miami Gardens, FL	ABC	W 25–24	55,799
October 21	3:30 p.m.	Syracuse	No. 8	Hard Rock Stadium; Miami Gardens, FL	ESPN	W 27–19	56,158
October 28	12:00 p.m.	at North Carolina	No. 8	Kenan Memorial Stadium; Chapel Hill, NC	ESPN2	W 24–19	45,000
November 4	8:00 p.m.	No. 13 Virginia Tech^{†}	No. 10	Hard Rock Stadium; Miami Gardens, FL (rivalry)	ABC	W 28–10	63,932
November 11	8:00 p.m.	No. 3 Notre Dame*	No. 7	Hard Rock Stadium; Miami Gardens, FL (College GameDay) (rivalry)	ABC	W 41–8	65,303
November 18	12:00 p.m.	Virginia	No. 3	Hard Rock Stadium; Miami Gardens, FL	ABC	W 44–28	63,415
November 24	12:00 p.m.	at Pittsburgh	No. 2	Heinz Field; Pittsburgh, PA	ABC	L 14–24	35,978
December 2	8:00 p.m.	vs. No. 1 Clemson	No. 7	Bank of America Stadium; Charlotte, NC (ACC Championship Game / College GameDay)	ABC	L 3–38	74,372
December 30	8:00 p.m.	No. 6 Wisconsin*	No. 10	Hard Rock Stadium; Miami Gardens, FL (Orange Bowl)	ESPN	L 24–34	65,032
*Non-conference game; ^{†}Homecoming; Rankings from AP Poll and CFP Rankings after October 31 released prior to game; All times are in Eastern time

The scheduled game between Arkansas State and Miami originally set for September 9 was canceled in the wake of Hurricane Irma due to travel concerns and was not rescheduled.

^{^[b]}The game between Florida State and Miami, originally scheduled to be played on September 16, was moved to October 7 due to the effects of Hurricane Irma.
^{^[c]}The game between Georgia Tech and Miami, originally scheduled to be played on October 12, was moved to October 14.

== Game summaries ==
=== Bethune–Cookman ===
	1	2	3	4	Total
Wildcats	3	3	7	0	13
No. 18 Hurricanes	3	21	14	3	41

=== Toledo ===
	1	2	3	4	Total
Rockets	0	16	0	14	30
No. 14 Hurricanes	10	0	14	28	52

=== At Duke ===
	1	2	3	4	Total
No. 14 Hurricanes	14	3	0	14	31
Blue Devils	3	3	0	0	6

=== At Florida State ===
	1	2	3	4	Total
No. 13 Hurricanes	0	0	10	14	24
Seminoles	3	0	0	17	20

=== Georgia Tech ===
	1	2	3	4	Total
Yellow Jackets	7	7	10	0	24
No. 11 Hurricanes	3	10	3	9	25

=== Syracuse ===
	1	2	3	4	Total
Orange	0	3	10	6	19
No. 8 Hurricanes	3	10	7	7	27

=== At North Carolina ===
	1	2	3	4	Total
No. 8 Hurricanes	0	7	10	7	24
Tar Heels	3	3	7	6	19

=== Virginia Tech ===
	1	2	3	4	Total
No. 13 Hokies	0	3	7	0	10
No. 9 Hurricanes	0	14	7	7	28

=== Notre Dame ===
	1	2	3	4	Total
No. 3 Fighting Irish	0	0	8	0	8
No. 7 Hurricanes	14	13	7	7	41

=== Virginia ===
	1	2	3	4	Total
Cavaliers	14	7	7	0	28
No. 2 Hurricanes	7	7	17	13	44

=== At Pittsburgh ===
	1	2	3	4	Total
No. 2 Hurricanes	0	7	0	7	14
Panthers	3	7	7	7	24

=== Clemson - ACC Championship ===
	1	2	3	4	Total
No. 7 Hurricanes	0	0	0	3	3
No. 1 Tigers	14	7	17	0	38

=== Wisconsin - 2017 Orange Bowl ===
	1	2	3	4	Total
No. 6 Badgers	3	21	3	7	34
No. 10 Hurricanes	14	0	7	3	24

== Rankings ==
Ranking movements Legend: ██ Increase in ranking ██ Decrease in ranking ( ) = First-place votes
	Week															
Poll	Pre	1	2	3	4	5	6	7	8	9	10	11	12	13	14	Final
AP	18	16	17	14	14	13	11	8	8	9	7	2 (4)	2 (3)	7	11	13
Coaches	18	17	15	14	13	12	10	7	8	6	6	2	2	7	11	13
CFP	Not released									10	7	3	2	7	10	Not released

== 2018 NFL draft ==
Player	Position	Round	Pick	Team
Chad Thomas	Defensive end	3	67	Cleveland Browns
Chris Herndon	Tight end	4	107	New York Jets
Mark Walton	Running back	4	112	Cincinnati Bengals
R. J. McIntosh	Defensive tackle	5	139	New York Giants
Braxton Berrios	Wide receiver	6	210	New England Patriots
Kendrick Norton	Defensive tackle	7	242	Carolina Panthers
