= 2018 Pinstripe Bowl =

College football bowl game

2018 New Era Pinstripe Bowl
- 9th Pinstripe Bowl
Miami Hurricanes	Wisconsin Badgers
(7–5)	(7–5)
ACC	Big Ten
3	35
Head coach: Mark Richt	Head coach: Paul Chryst
	1	2	3	4	Total
Miami	3	0	0	0	3
Wisconsin	14	0	7	14	35
- Date: December 27, 2018
- Season: 2018
- Stadium: Yankee Stadium
- Location: Bronx, New York
- MVP: Jonathan Taylor (RB, Wisconsin)
- Favorite: Miami by 4
- Referee: Ken Williamson (SEC)
- Attendance: 37,821
- Payout: US$4,300,000

United States TV coverage
- Network: ESPN & ESPN Radio
- Announcers: Bob Wischusen, Mike Golic Jr., Dan Orlovsky and Paul Carcaterra (ESPN); Kevin Winter, Jack Ford and C.J. Papa (ESPN Radio)

International TV coverage
- Network: ESPN Deportes

The 2018 Pinstripe Bowl was a college football bowl game played on December 27, 2018. It was the ninth edition of the Pinstripe Bowl, and one of the 2018–19 bowl games concluding the 2018 FBS football season. Sponsored by the New Era Cap Company, the game was officially known as the New Era Pinstripe Bowl. The game was a rematch of the 2017 Orange Bowl, won by Wisconsin, 34–24.

== Teams ==
The game was played between teams from the Atlantic Coast Conference (ACC) and the Big Ten Conference.

=== Miami Hurricanes ===
Miami received and accepted a bid to the Pinstripe Bowl on December 2. The Hurricanes entered the bowl with a 7–5 record (4–4 in conference). This was the second time Miami has played in a New York City bowl game, with their first visit (also in Yankee Stadium) resulting in a 34–36 loss to Nebraska in the 1962 Gotham Bowl.

On December 26, senior Malik Rosier was named Miami's starting quarterback over redshirt freshman N'Kosi Perry. Head coach Mark Richt made it clear that Perry was not suspended and that he was available to play "as of right now" in response to questions by the media regarding his eligibility as a result of sexually explicit videos posted to Perry's social media accounts. In the game, Rosier was 5-for-12 passing (with three interceptions) and gained 90 yards rushing, while Perry was 1-for-5 passing (with one interception) and 11 yards rushing.

=== Wisconsin Badgers ===
Wisconsin received and accepted a bid to the Pinstripe Bowl on December 2. The Badgers entered the bowl with a 7–5 record (5–4 in conference).

== Game summary ==
=== Scoring summary ===
Scoring summary

Quarter	Time	Drive			Team	Scoring information	Score	
Quarter	Time	Plays	Yards	TOP	Team	Scoring information	MIA	WISC
1	11:56	6	65	3:04	WISC	Kendric Pryor 35-yard touchdown reception from Jack Coan, Rafael Gaglianone kick good	0	7
1	11:30	1	7	0:07	WISC	Jonathan Taylor 7-yard touchdown run, Rafael Gaglianone kick good	0	14
1	1:15	6	76	2:23	MIA	33-yard field goal by Bubba Baxa	3	14
3	3:36	4	59	1:42	WISC	Alec Ingold 2-yard touchdown run, Rafael Gaglianone kick good	3	21
4	9:59	5	34	2:18	WISC	Jack Coan 7-yard touchdown run, Rafael Gaglianone kick good	3	28
4	0:08	10	53	7:12	WISC	Taiwan Deal 1-yard touchdown run, Rafael Gaglianone kick good	3	35
"TOP" = time of possession. For other American football terms, see Glossary of American football.							3	35

=== Statistics ===
	1	2	3	4	Total
Hurricanes	3	0	0	0	3
Badgers	14	0	7	14	35

Statistics	MIA	WISC
First downs	6	20
Plays–yards	40–169	69–406
Rushes–yards	23–121	58–333
Passing yards	48	73
Passing: comp–att–int	6–17–4	6–11–1
Turnovers		
Time of possession	20:13	39:47

Team	Category	Player	Statistics
Miami (FL)	Passing	Malik Rosier	5/12, 46 yds, 3 INT
Miami (FL)	Rushing	Malik Rosier	3 car, 90 yds
Miami (FL)	Receiving	Lawrence Cager	1 rec, 22 yds
Wisconsin	Passing	Jack Coan	6/11, 73 yds, 1 TD, 1 INT
Wisconsin	Rushing	Jonathan Taylor	27 car, 205 yds, 1 TD
Wisconsin	Receiving	Kendric Pryor	1 rec, 35 yds, 1 TD
