= Jonathan Taylor =

American football player (born 1999)

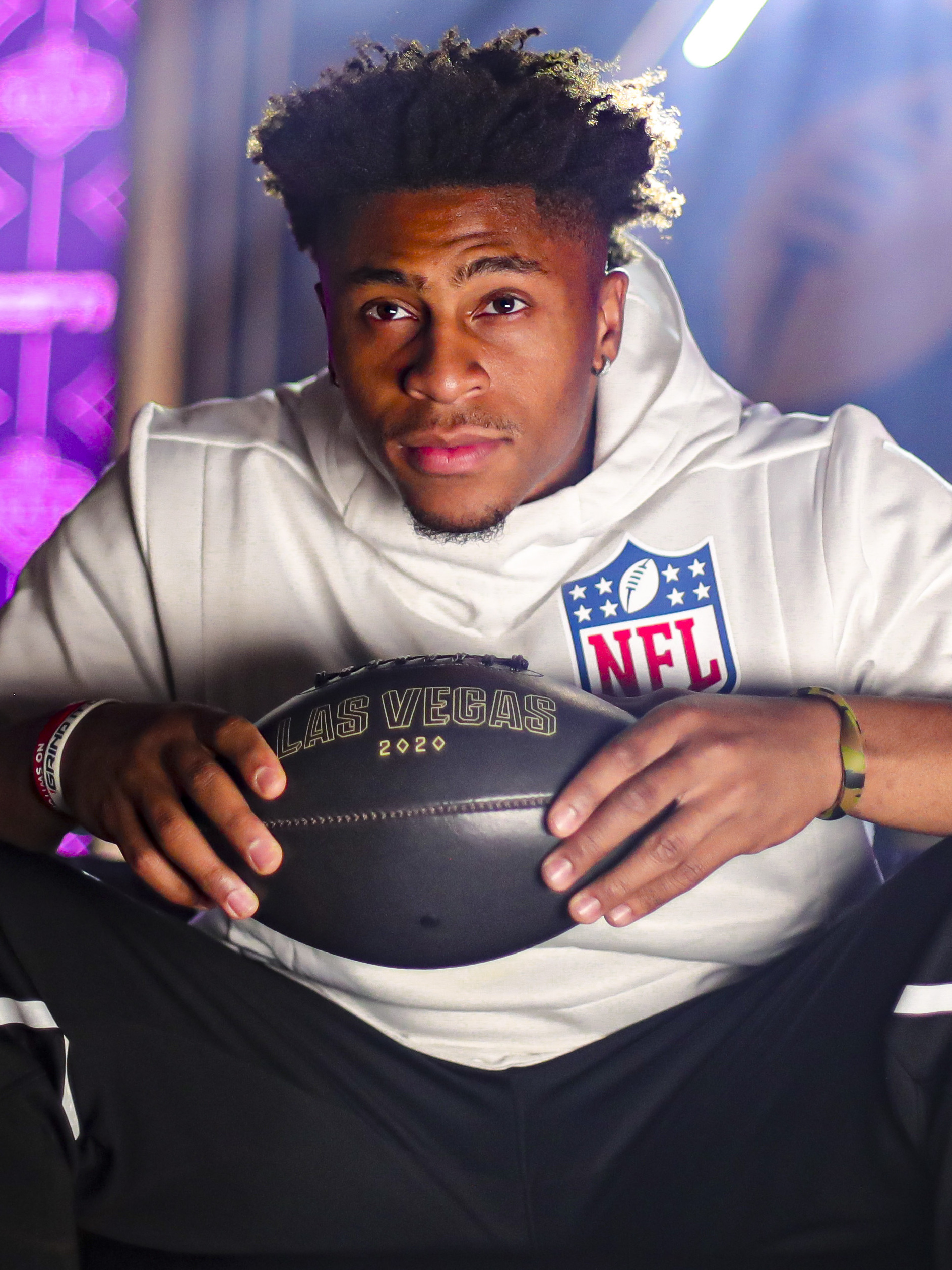
- Taylor in 2020

No. 28 – Indianapolis Colts
- Position: Running back
- Roster status: Active

Personal information
- Born: January 19, 1999 (age 27); Salem, New Jersey, U.S.
- Listed height: 5 ft 10 in (1.78 m)
- Listed weight: 226 lb (103 kg)

Career information
- High school: Salem
- College: Wisconsin (2017–2019)
- NFL draft: 2020: 2nd round, 41st overall pick

Career history
- Indianapolis Colts (2020–present)

Awards and highlights
- First-team All-Pro (2021); 3× Pro Bowl (2021, 2024, 2025); NFL rushing yards leader (2021); 2× NFL rushing touchdowns leader (2021, 2025); Bert Bell Award (2021); PFWA All-Rookie Team (2020); 2× Doak Walker Award (2018, 2019); 2× Unanimous All-American (2018, 2019); Second-team All-American (2017); NCAA rushing yards leader (2018); NCAA scoring leader (2019); NCAA (FBS) records: Most career 200-yard rushing games: 12; Most seasons with 1,750+ rushing yards: 3

Career NFL statistics as of Week 11, 2026
- Rushing yards: 8,358
- Rushing average: 4.8
- Rushing touchdowns: 77
- Receptions: 219
- Receiving yards: 1,715
- Receiving touchdowns: 7
- Stats at Pro Football Reference

Jonathan Taylor (born January 19, 1999) is an American professional football running back for the Indianapolis Colts of the National Football League (NFL).

Taylor played high school football at Salem High School, where he set a New Jersey state rushing yards record. He played three seasons of college football for the Wisconsin Badgers, finishing his college career as the sixth all-time rusher in the NCAA and became the first player in FBS history to rush for more than 6,000 yards in any three-year span. Taylor finished in the top ten of Heisman Trophy voting three times, was named a unanimous first-team All-American, and was a recipient of the Doak Walker Award in both the 2018 and 2019 seasons. He was selected by the Colts in the second round of the 2020 NFL draft. In 2021, Taylor led the NFL in both rushing yards and touchdowns, becoming a unanimous All-Pro and Pro Bowler in the same season.

== Early life ==
Taylor was born in Salem, New Jersey, to Elizabeth Taylor and Jonathan James. His father played basketball for San Francisco State from 1982 to 1986. Taylor attended Salem High School, where he amassed 4,642 rushing yards and 51 touchdowns. As a senior, he set the New Jersey record with 2,815 rushing yards, which had been held by former Wisconsin Badgers running back Corey Clement. In his senior season, Taylor averaged 234.6 yards a game, rushing for 35 touchdowns and scoring 37 total, and was honored with the Jim Henry Award as the high school area player of the year for New Jersey, Pennsylvania, and Delaware. Taylor was also an accomplished performer in track and field, and he won two state titles in the 100-meter dash, his best time being 10.49 seconds.

247Sports rated Taylor as a three-star prospect and the 24th-highest ranked running back in the class of 2017. He committed to play college football at Rutgers University, but later changed it to the University of Wisconsin–Madison on November 1, 2016.

== College career ==
=== Freshman season ===
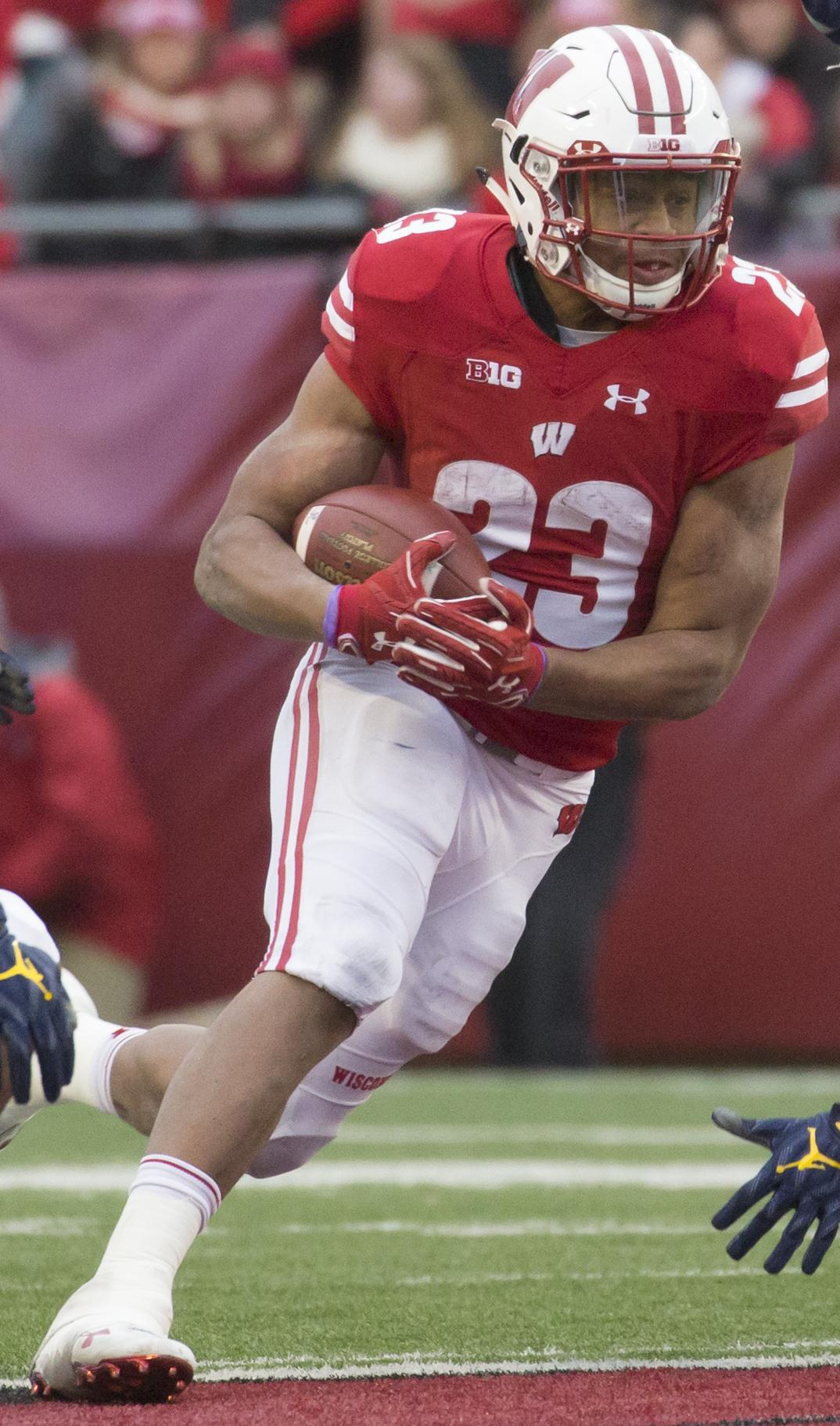
Taylor with Wisconsin in 2017 at Camp Randall Stadium

After fall camp in 2017, Taylor opened his freshman year at Wisconsin as one of the team's starting running backs alongside Bradrick Shaw and Chris James. In his first collegiate game against Utah State, he had nine carries for 87 yards and a touchdown in the 59–10 win at home. In his second game against Florida Atlantic, Taylor ran the ball 26 times for 223 yards and a season-high three rushing touchdowns in the 31–14 win. After his fifth game of the season, in which he ran 25 carries for a season-high 249 yards in a 38–17 road victory against Nebraska, he entered the Heisman Trophy conversation and was routinely listed among the top-five Heisman candidates. The following game against Purdue, Taylor had 30 carries for 219 rushing yards and a touchdown in the 17–9 victory.

On October 21, 2017, in his seventh collegiate game, Taylor reached the 1,000-yard rushing mark, tying the FBS freshman record for fewest games to reach 1,000 yards; the previous backs to accomplish this feat were Florida's Emmitt Smith (1987), San Diego State's Marshall Faulk (1991), Oklahoma's Adrian Peterson (2004), North Texas' Jamario Thomas (2004) and Wisconsin's P. J. Hill (2006). Taylor had 22 carries for 126 yards and a touchdown in the 38–13 home victory over Maryland.

Two weeks later, Taylor rushed for 183 yards on 29 carries with a touchdown in Wisconsin's 45–17 win over Indiana on the road, winning his fifth Big Ten Freshman of the Week award. On October 30, Taylor was named a semifinalist for the Maxwell Award. On November 17, he was named a semifinalist for the Doak Walker Award given to the top running back in the country. Just three days later, he was named one of three Doak Walker Award finalists, along with Penn State's Saquon Barkley and Stanford's Bryce Love. Following the final game of the season against Wisconsin's rival Minnesota, Taylor won his eighth Big Ten Freshman of the Week award. He set a new Big Ten record as he surpassed Ohio State quarterback J. T. Barrett's record of seven Big Ten Freshman of the Week awards set in 2014. On November 27, Taylor was listed as a consensus first-team All-Big Ten pick by the Big Ten coaches and media, and was named the conference's freshman of the year. He finished sixth in the Heisman Trophy voting.

Taylor finished his freshman season with 1,977 rushing yards and 13 touchdowns, finishing second all-time in rushing yards among FBS freshmen, behind fellow Wisconsin running back Ron Dayne (2,109 yards in 1996). Since the NCAA does not include bowl-game stats for the period Dayne played, Taylor is the official record holder for freshman rushing yards. The latter led the Big Ten in rushing yards, while finishing third in the FBS in rushing yards (behind Rashaad Penny and Bryce Love). Taylor was second in the Big Ten in rushing touchdowns (Barkley with 18). He helped the Badgers to a school-record-setting 13 wins, an appearance in the 2017 Big Ten Championship Game, and a 34–24 victory over Miami (FL) in the Orange Bowl.

=== Sophomore season ===
Taylor entered the 2018 season as a consensus preseason All-American and was featured on watch lists for the Maxwell Award, the Doak Walker Award, and the Walter Camp Award. Taylor's return, as well as those of many other key members of the 2017 Orange Bowl-winning Wisconsin team, led the Badgers to become ranked fourth in the preseason AP Poll, tied for the highest start in school history. He was the seventh-ranked college football player by ESPN during the preseason.

Taylor started off the season with 18 carries for 145 rushing yards and two rushing touchdowns in a 34–3 victory over Western Kentucky. In the second game, Taylor set a career-high with 253 rushing yards, to go along with three touchdowns, in a 45–14 win over New Mexico. He was named Big Ten Offensive Player of the Week for his performance. Taylor again eclipsed the 200-yard mark when he put up 221 yards and three touchdowns on 24 attempts (9.1 yards per attempt) against Nebraska on October 6. However, the Badgers faltered, losing five regular-season games and soon falling out of the rankings. On November 3, Taylor had 27 carries for 208 rushing yards and three rushing touchdowns in a 31–17 victory over Rutgers. In a triple-overtime win over Purdue on November 17, he put up a career-high 321 yards and three touchdowns. The game earned him his fourth career Big Ten Offensive Player of the Week honors (shared that week with Dwayne Haskins). Wisconsin, 7–5 in the regular season, earned an invitation to the Pinstripe Bowl against Miami (FL) in a rematch of the previous year's Orange Bowl. Taylor put up 205 rushing yards and a touchdown in the game, helping the Badgers to a 35–3 win and earning game MVP honors.

During the 2018 season, Taylor led the FBS in rushing yards (2,194) and attempts (307), finishing in the top ten for yards per attempt (7.1) and rushing touchdowns (16). He finished ninth in Heisman Trophy voting. He received the Doak Walker Award, given annually to college football's top running back. Taylor was named a unanimous first-team All-American, first-team All-Big Ten, and Big Ten Running Back of the Year. He became the third Badger running back to eclipse the 2,000-yard mark, following Ron Dayne and Melvin Gordon.

=== Junior season ===
Taylor was a unanimous preseason All-American heading into the 2019 season and was widely considered a preseason Heisman Trophy candidate. In Wisconsin's opening game against South Florida, Taylor rushed for 135 yards and two touchdowns and added two touchdown receptions through the air. He became the first Big Ten player to record two rushing and receiving touchdowns in the same game since 2010, and was named Big Ten Offensive Player of the Week. In a Week 4 victory over No. 11 Michigan, Taylor rushed for 203 yards and two touchdowns, becoming the first Wisconsin player to rush for 200 yards against the Wolverines. He earned his sixth career Big Ten Offensive Player of the Week honors for the performance. On November 9, against Iowa, he had 31 carries for 250 rushing yards in the 24–22 victory. In a November 16 game against Nebraska, Taylor rushed for 204 yards and two touchdowns, and in the process broke Herschel Walker’s record for the most rushing yards through a junior season. He was named Big Ten Co-Offensive Player of the Week (along with Shea Patterson), his fourth Player of the Week honors of the season. The next week, against Purdue, Taylor accomplished his FBS-record-setting 12th career 200-yard game.

Taylor and the Badgers represented the West Division in the Big Ten Championship Game, but fell to Ohio State 34–21. The team was invited to the Rose Bowl to play Pac-12 champion Oregon, losing 28–27, to end the year at 10–4. Taylor finished fifth in the Heisman Trophy voting in 2019. During the Rose Bowl, Taylor eclipsed the 2,000-yard mark for the season and became the second FBS player with two 2,000-yard seasons (following Troy Davis). Taylor finished the season tied atop the Big Ten and tied for third nationally with Ohio State's J. K. Dobbins in both rushing yards and rushing touchdowns; each had 2,003 yards and 21 touchdowns. For the second consecutive year, Taylor was named a unanimous first-team All-American, first-team All-Big Ten, and the Big Ten Running Back of the Year. He was again the recipient of the Doak Walker Award, becoming the first player to win the award twice since Darren McFadden did so in 2006 and 2007.

On January 3, 2020, it was announced that Taylor would skip his senior season, and enlist in the that years draft. Taylor ended his college career at fourth on the all-time FBS rushing-yards list, sixth all time when bowl games are included, with 6,174 yards.

== Professional career ==
Pre-draft measurables
Height	Weight	Arm length	Hand span	Wingspan	40-yard dash	10-yard split	20-yard split	20-yard shuttle	Three-cone drill	Vertical jump	Broad jump	Bench press
5 ft 10 1/4 in (1.78 m)	226 lb (103 kg)	31 1/8 in (0.79 m)	9 1/2 in (0.24 m)	6 ft 3 3/8 in (1.91 m)	4.39 s	1.46 s	2.56 s	4.24 s	7.01 s	36.0 in (0.91 m)	10 ft 3 in (3.12 m)	17 reps
All values from NFL Combine

=== 2020 season ===
Taylor was selected in the second round of the 2020 NFL draft with the 41st pick by the Indianapolis Colts, who had acquired the pick from the Cleveland Browns in a trade. Michael Renner of Pro Football Focus ranked Taylor as being in the best situation to succeed with the Colts.

Taylor was named the Colts backup running back to starter Marlon Mack at the start of the season. Taylor made his NFL debut in Week 1 of the 2020 season against the Jacksonville Jaguars. He had nine rushing attempts for 22 rushing yards and six receptions for 67 receiving yards in the 27–20 loss. The day after the game, it was revealed that Mack had suffered a torn achilles tendon, leaving Taylor in the starting position at running back for the remainder of the season. The following week against the Minnesota Vikings, he had 26 attempts for 101 rushing yards and one rushing touchdown in the 28–11 victory. In Week 6 against the Cincinnati Bengals, Taylor recorded 115 yards from scrimmage during the 31–27 win. He was placed on the reserve/COVID-19 list by the team on November 28, 2020, and activated on December 2. In Week 13 against the Houston Texans, Taylor recorded 135 yards from scrimmage and a receiving touchdown during the 26–20 win. In Week 14 against the Las Vegas Raiders, Taylor rushed for 150 yards, a then career-long 62-yard rush and two touchdowns during the 44–27 win. In Week 16, against the Pittsburgh Steelers, he recorded two rushing touchdowns in the 28–24 loss. Taylor had a career game in Week 17, picking up 253 yards and two touchdowns, which tied for ninth all-time rushing yards in a game, and surpassing Edgerrin James for the Colts franchise record in a game, as he surpassed 1,000 yards on the season and the Colts defeated the Jacksonville Jaguars 28–14. Taylor won FedEx Ground Player of the Week in that game, with more yards and yards per carry than Derrick Henry that week. He finished the regular season with 232 rushing attempts for 1,169 yards, 11 touchdowns, with only one fumble. He finished third in the league in rushing yards behind Dalvin Cook and Derrick Henry. Taylor was named the NFL Offensive Rookie of the Month for his performance in December. For his season, Taylor was also named to the PFWA All-Rookie Team for that year.

=== 2021 season ===
Taylor was named the starting running back for the Colts to start the 2021 season. He had 103 yards and a rushing touchdown on 16 rushing attempts in Week 4 victory against the Miami Dolphins. The following week, Taylor had 169 total scrimmage yards: 53 yards rushing with a touchdown, and 116 yards receiving with a 76-yard receiving touchdown in the 31–25 overtime loss against the Baltimore Ravens. Against the Texans in Week 6, Taylor had 14 attempts for 145 yards and two touchdowns; his rushing total included a career best 83-yard rush. The Colts would win the game 31–3. Taylor won AFC Offensive Player of the Month for October. On a Thursday-night game against the New York Jets in Week 9, Taylor had 200 total scrimmage yards, including 172 rushing yards and two touchdowns in the 45–30 victory. In Week 10 at home against the Jaguars, Taylor had 21 attempts for 116 yards and a touchdown in the 23–17 victory. At this point in the season, Taylor was tied for the rushing title with Derrick Henry, who was out for the season with an injury, with 937 rushing yards.

In Week 11 against the Buffalo Bills, Taylor had 204 total yards, including 185 rushing yards on 32 attempts, and five total touchdowns (four rushing, one receiving), in the Colts' 41–15 win. In doing so, he broke the Colts franchise record for rushing touchdowns in a game, as well as total touchdowns in a game. Taylor was named AFC Offensive Player of the Week for his performance. Taylor won AFC Offensive Player of the Month for November. He had 32 carries for 143 yards and two touchdowns in a 31–0 shutout victory against the Houston Texans in Week 13. Against the New England Patriots in Week 15, Taylor had 29 attempts for 170 yards and a 67-yard touchdown in the 27–17 victory. Despite having several offensive linemen out with injuries and COVID-19, Taylor had 27 attempts for 108 yards in the 22–16 victory against the Arizona Cardinals. The following week against the Raiders, Taylor had 20 attempts for 108 yards in the 23–20 loss. In the final game of the season, Taylor had 15 attempts for 75 yards as the Colts were upset by the Jacksonville Jaguars 26–11, missing the postseason as a result.

Taylor was selected to the 2022 Pro Bowl, after receiving the most votes in fan Pro Bowl voting. With him finishing the season with 1,811 rushing yards and 18 rushing touchdowns, Taylor was both the rushing yards leader and rushing touchdown leader for 2021. He ended the season with more than 500 yards ahead of the second-place rushing yards leader Nick Chubb. He was unanimously selected First-team 2021 All-Pro Team. Taylor started all 17 games. He finished tied for first in total touchdowns (20), and ranked second in the league in total points (120) by non-kickers.

From Weeks 4–11, Taylor compiled 100-plus scrimmage yards and at least one rushing touchdown in eight consecutive games, which tied for the longest streak in NFL history. After the season, the Maxwell Football Club announced that Taylor was the winner of the 2021 Bert Bell Award. He was the runner-up for AP Offensive Player of the Year. He was ranked fifth by his fellow players on the NFL Top 100 Players of 2022.

=== 2022 season ===
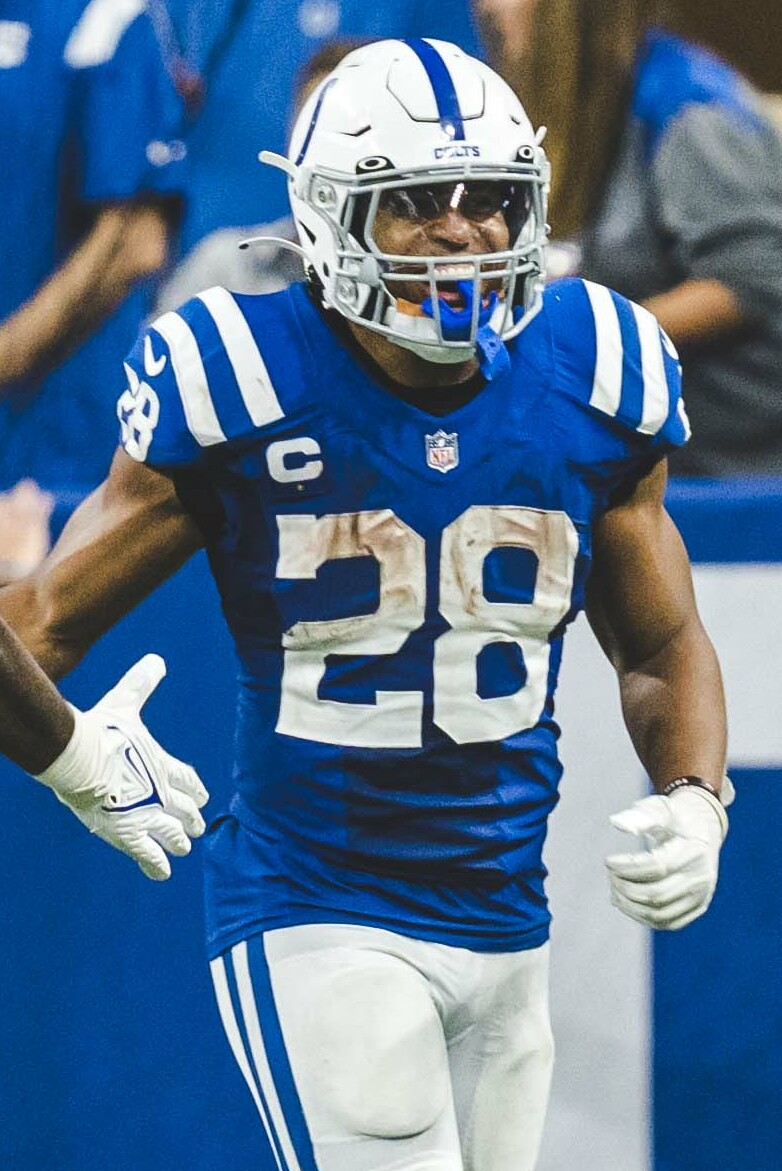
Taylor with the Indianapolis Colts in 2022

In Week 1, against the Texans, Taylor had 31 carries for 161 rushing yards and a rushing touchdown in the 20–20 tie. After suffering an ankle injury in the fourth quarter of a Week 4 loss against the Tennessee Titans, Taylor was later ruled out for the Colts' Week 5 matchup against the Denver Broncos. The contest served as the first game that Taylor had missed in his NFL career. In Week 10, against the Raiders, he had 22 carries for 147 rushing yards and one rushing touchdown in the 25–20 victory. For his game against Las Vegas, he won AFC Offensive Player of the Week. He suffered a high ankle sprain in Week 15 and was placed on injured reserve on December 20, 2022, ending his season. He finished the season with 861 rushing yards and four touchdowns through 11 games, missing three games with an ankle injury.

=== 2023 season ===
On August 29, 2023, Taylor was placed on the physically unable to perform list. During this period, it was reported that Taylor and the Colts reached a contract standoff, with Taylor requesting a trade after a meeting with Colts owner Jim Irsay.

However, Taylor and the Colts were able to reach an agreement. On October 7, 2023, he was activated, and signed a three-year, $42 million extension with the Colts. In the season finale against the Houston Texans, Taylor rushed for a season-high 188 rushing yards on 30 carries, with a touchdown. He finished the season with 741 rushing yards and seven touchdowns, along with 19 catches for 153 yards and one touchdown through 10 games and seven starts.

=== 2024 season ===
In Week 3, against the Chicago Bears, Taylor had 23 carries for 110 rushing yards and two rushing touchdowns in the 21–16 win. In Week 16, Taylor rushed for 218 yards and three touchdowns in a 38–30 win over the Tennessee Titans, earning AFC Offensive Player of the Week. In Week 17 against the New York Giants, he had 32 carries for 125 yards and two touchdowns. In Week 18 against the Jaguars, he had 34 carries for 177 yards and a touchdown in the 26–23 win. In the 2024 season, Taylor finished with 303 carries for 1,431 rushing yards and 11 rushing touchdowns to go with 18 receptions for 136 receiving yards and one receiving touchdown. Taylor was again selected to the 2024 Pro Bowl, his first since the 2021 Pro Bowl.

=== 2025 season ===
In Week 2 of the 2025 season, Taylor totaled 215 yards from scrimmage, including 25 carries for 165 yards and a receiving touchdown in a 29–28 win over the Denver Broncos, earning AFC Offensive Player of the Week. In Week 3 against the Tennessee Titans, Taylor had a second consecutive 100-yard rushing game. He ran the ball 17 times for 102 yards on the ground as he scored three rushing touchdowns in the 41–20 road victory. For the second consecutive week, Taylor earned AFC Offensive Player of the Week for his performance. In Week 5, against the Raiders, he had three rushing touchdowns in the 40–6 win. In Week 8 against the Titans, he had 12 carries for 153 rushing yards and three total touchdowns in the 38–14 win.

In Week 10 of the 2025 season, Taylor rushed for 244 yards on 32 carries and scored three touchdowns against the Atlanta Falcons in Berlin, Germany. He also scored his 65th career rushing touchdown, breaking Hall of Famer Edgerrin James' Colts franchise record and scored the game winning touchdown in overtime. For the third time in the 2025 season, he earned AFC Offensive Player of the Week. In the 2025 season, he finished with 323 carries for 1,585 rushing yards and 18 rushing touchdowns to go with 46 receptions for 378 receiving yards and two receiving touchdowns. He led the NFL in rushing attempts and rushing touchdowns. He earned Pro Bowl honors for the 2025 season. He was ranked seventeenth by his fellow players on the NFL Top 100 Players of 2026.

=== 2026 season ===
On August 6, 2026, the Colts signed Taylor to a two-year, $44 million contract extension with $39 million guaranteed, making him the second-highest paid running back in the league.

== Career statistics ==
Legend
	Led the league
**Bold**	Career high

=== NFL ===
==== Regular season ====
Year	Team	Games		Rushing						Receiving					Fumbles	
Year	Team	GP	GS	Att	Yds	Avg	Y/G	Lng	TD	Rec	Yds	Avg	Lng	TD	Fum	Lost
2020	IND	15	13	232	1,169	5.0	77.9	62	11	36	299	8.3	39	1	1	1
2021	IND	17	17	**332**	**1,811**	**5.5**	**106.5**	**83**	**18**	40	360	**9.0**	**76**	**2**	**4**	2
2022	IND	11	11	192	861	4.5	78.3	66	4	28	143	5.1	19	0	3	**3**
2023	IND	10	7	169	741	4.4	74.1	49	7	19	153	8.1	40	1	1	0
2024	IND	14	13	303	1,431	4.7	102.2	70	11	18	136	7.6	25	1	**4**	1
2025	IND	17	17	323	1,585	4.9	93.2	**83**	**18**	**46**	**378**	8.2	43	**2**	2	1
2026	IND	11	11	188	760	4.0	69.1	38	8	32	246	7.7	38	0	**5**	0
Career		95	89	1,739	8,358	4.8	88.0	83	77	219	1,715	7.8	76	7	20	8

==== Postseason ====
Year	Team	Games		Rushing					Receiving					Fumbles	
Year	Team	GP	GS	Att	Yds	Avg	Lng	TD	Rec	Yds	Avg	Lng	TD	Fum	Lost
2020	IND	1	1	21	78	3.7	20	1	2	6	3.0	6	0	0	0
Career		1	1	21	78	3.7	20	1	2	6	3.0	6	0	0	0

=== College ===
Legend
Led the NCAA

Season	Team	Games		Rushing				Receiving			
Season	Team	GP	GS	Att	Yds	Avg	TD	Rec	Yds	Avg	TD
2017	Wisconsin	14	13	299	1,977	6.6	13	8	95	**11.9**	0
2018	Wisconsin	13	13	307	**2,194**	**7.1**	16	8	60	7.5	0
2019	Wisconsin	14	14	**320**	2,003	6.3	**21**	**26**	**252**	9.7	**5**
Career		41	40	926	6,174	6.7	50	42	407	9.7	5

== Career highlights ==
=== Awards and honors ===
NFL

- Bert Bell Award (2021)
- First-team All-Pro (2021)
- 3× Pro Bowl (2021, 2024, 2025)
- NFL rushing yards leader (2021)
- 2× NFL rushing touchdowns leader (2021, 2025)
- PFWA All-Rookie Team (2020)
- FedEx Ground Player of the Year (2021)
- SN NFL Player of the Year (2021)
- Ranked No. 5 in the Top 100 Players of 2022
- Ranked No. 17 in the Top 100 Players of 2026

College

- 2× Unanimous first-team All-American (2018, 2019)
- Second-team All-American (2017)
- NCAA rushing yards leader (2018)
- NCAA scoring leader (2019)
- 2× Doak Walker Award winner (2018, 2019)
- AP Big Ten Newcomer of the Year (2017)
- Pinstripe Bowl MVP (2018)
- Big Ten Ameche-Dayne Running Back of the Year (2018, 2019)
- Big Ten Thompson–Randle El Freshman of the Year (2017)
- 3× consensus first-team All-Big Ten (2017, 2018, 2019)
- 8× Big Ten Offensive Player of the Week (2× 2017, 2× 2018, 4× 2019)
- 8× Big Ten Freshman of the Week (2017)

=== Records ===
==== NFL records ====
- Most consecutive games with at least 100 rushing yards and a rushing touchdown - 8 (2021) (shares with Lydell Mitchell and LaDainian Tomlinson)
- The youngest player in NFL history with at least 2,000 scrimmage yards (2,171) and 20 scrimmage touchdowns (20) in a single season (2021)

==== Colts franchise records ====
- Most rushing yards in a single season: 1,811 (2021)
- Most games of 50+ rushing yards in a season: 17 (2021)
- Most games of 170+ rushing yards: 4
- Most rushing yards in a game: 253 (January 3, 2021, against the Jacksonville Jaguars)
- Most rushing touchdowns in a single season: 18 (2021, 2025)
- Most rushing touchdowns in a game: 4 (tied with Joseph Addai, Eric Dickerson)
- Most total touchdowns in a season: 20 (tied with Lenny Moore)
- Most total touchdowns in a single game: 5 (2021)
- Longest rushing play: 83 yards (2021, 2025)
- Most career rushing touchdowns (69)

==== College records ====
NCAA Division I FBS

- Most 1,750-yard rushing seasons: 3
- Most 200-yard rushing games (career): 12
- Most rushing yards through junior season: 6,174
- Most rushing yards through sophomore season: 4,171
- Most rushing yards in a season by a freshman: 1,977
- Fewest games for a freshman to reach 1,000 rushing yards: 7 games (tied with 6 others)

Big Ten Conference

- Most Big Ten Freshman of the Week awards: 8
