= Travis Homer =

American football player (born 1998)

No. 21 – Pittsburgh Steelers
- Position: Running back
- Roster status: Active

Personal information
- Born: August 7, 1998 (age 28); Palm Beach, Florida, U.S.
- Listed height: 5 ft 10 in (1.78 m)
- Listed weight: 211 lb (96 kg)

Career information
- High school: Oxbridge Academy (West Palm Beach)
- College: Miami (FL) (2016–2018)
- NFL draft: 2019: 6th round, 204th overall pick

Career history
- Seattle Seahawks (2019–2022); Chicago Bears (2023–2025); Pittsburgh Steelers (2026–present)

Awards and highlights
- Second-team All-ACC (2017)

Career NFL statistics as of 2026
- Rushing yards: 489
- Rushing average: 5.1
- Rushing touchdowns: 1
- Receptions: 55
- Receiving yards: 475
- Receiving touchdowns: 2
- Return yards: 473
- Return touchdowns: 1
- Stats at Pro Football Reference

Travis Homer (born August 7, 1998) is an American professional football running back for the Pittsburgh Steelers of the National Football League (NFL). He played college football for the Miami Hurricanes.

== Early life ==
Homer attended Oxbridge Academy in West Palm Beach, Florida. During his high school football career, he had over 3,200 rushing yards and 50 total touchdowns. He committed to the University of Miami to play college football.

== College career ==
As a true freshman at Miami in 2016, Homer played in 12 games, rushing for 44 yards on seven carries. As a sophomore in 2017, he appeared in 13 games and started the final nine. He finished the season with 966 rushing yards on 163 carries with eight touchdowns. As a junior in 2018, he had 164 carries for 985 yards and four touchdowns. After the season, he entered the 2019 NFL draft.

=== Statistics ===
Season	Team	GP	Rushing				Receiving			
Season	Team	GP	Att	Yds	Avg	TD	Rec	Yds	Avg	TD
2016	Miami (FL)	7	7	44	6.3	0	0	0	0.0	0
2017	Miami (FL)	13	163	966	5.9	8	18	219	12.2	1
2018	Miami (FL)	13	164	985	6.0	4	19	186	9.8	0
Career		37	334	1,995	6.0	12	37	405	10.9	1

== Professional career ==
Pre-draft measurables
Height	Weight	Arm length	Hand span	Wingspan	40-yard dash	10-yard split	20-yard split	20-yard shuttle	Three-cone drill	Vertical jump	Broad jump	Bench press
5 ft 10 3/8 in (1.79 m)	201 lb (91 kg)	31 1/2 in (0.80 m)	10 in (0.25 m)	6 ft 3 1/2 in (1.92 m)	4.48 s	1.53 s	2.61 s	4.25 s	7.07 s	39.5 in (1.00 m)	10 ft 10 in (3.30 m)	17 reps
All values from NFL Combine/Pro Day

=== Seattle Seahawks ===
Homer was selected by the Seattle Seahawks in the sixth round (204th overall) of the 2019 NFL draft. His first career carry came on December 2, 2019, during Monday Night Football against the Minnesota Vikings, where he was snapped the ball on a fake punt and ran 29 yards for a first down. Homer made his first career start in Week 17 against the San Francisco 49ers after starting running backs Chris Carson and Rashaad Penny suffered season-ending injuries during the previous two games. During the game, Homer rushed 10 times for 62 yards and caught five passes for 30 yards in the 26–21 loss. Homer started Seattle's first playoff game against the Philadelphia Eagles, but was benched in favor of the newly resigned Marshawn Lynch in the Divisional Round matchup against the Green Bay Packers.

Homer entered the 2020 season third on the running back depth chart. He was placed on injured reserve on December 19, 2020.

In Week 8 of the 2021 season against the Jacksonville Jaguars, Homer recovered an onside kick with 1:49 left in the game and returned it 44 yards for a touchdown. The Seahawks would win 31–7. This was the first special teams touchdown for the Seahawks since the final week of the 2017 regular season. In Week 13, Homer scored a 73 yard touchdown on a fake punt against the San Francisco 49ers as the Seahawks would go on to win 30–23. He was named NFC Special Teams Player of the Week for his performance.

On September 28, 2022, Homer was placed on injured reserve. He was activated on October 29. On January 7, 2023, Homer was placed back on injured reserve with an ankle injury.

=== Chicago Bears ===
On March 15, 2023, Homer signed a two-year contract with the Chicago Bears worth up to $4.5 million. He played in 16 games for the Bears primarily on special teams, and recorded no carries in six offensive snaps.

Homer made 10 appearances for Chicago during the 2024 campaign, recording 23 rushing yards on six carries and 11 receiving yards on three receptions.

On March 17, 2025, Homer re-signed with the Bears on a one-year, $2 million contract.

=== Pittsburgh Steelers ===
On March 24, 2026, Homer signed with the Pittsburgh Steelers on a one-year contract. Homer was released by Pittsburgh as a part of final roster cuts on August 30; he was re-signed to the team's practice squad the following day. On September 26, Homer was promoted to the active roster.
