= N'Kosi Perry =

American football player (born 1998)

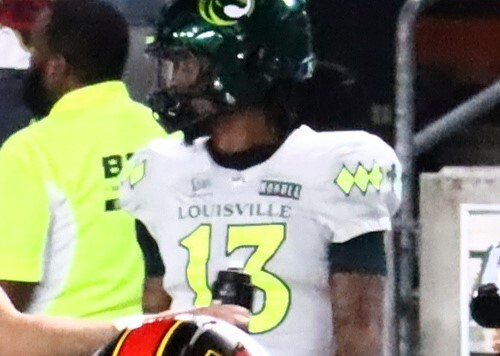
- Perry with the Louisville Kings in 2026

No. 13 – Louisville Kings
- Position: Quarterback
- Roster status: Active

Personal information
- Born: June 30, 1998 (age 28); Ocala, Florida, U.S.
- Listed height: 6 ft 2 in (1.88 m)
- Listed weight: 199 lb (90 kg)

Career information
- High school: Vanguard (FL)
- College: Miami (2017–2020); Florida Atlantic (2021–2022)
- NFL draft: 2023: undrafted

Career history
- Hamilton Tiger-Cats (2023); Seattle Sea Dragons (2024)*; Jacksonville Sharks (2024); Raiders Tirol (2024–2025); Louisville Kings (2026–present)
- * Offseason or practice squad member only

Awards and highlights
- UFL champion (2026)

N'Kosi Perry (born June 30, 1998) is an American football quarterback for the Louisville Kings of the United Football League (UFL). He played college football for the Miami Hurricanes and the Florida Atlantic Owls.

== Early life ==
Perry attended Vanguard High School in Ocala, Florida. He had 24 total touchdowns as a senior and 43 as a junior. He committed to the University of Miami to play college football.

== College career ==
Perry redshirted his first year at Miami in 2017. He entered 2018 as the backup to Malik Rosier. After missing the first game of the season due to a violation of team rules, he received his first playing time the next week against Savannah State, throwing for 93 yards and three touchdowns. Two weeks later against FIU, Perry replaced Rosier after two series, and completed 17 of 25 passes for 224 yards and three touchdowns. The next week against North Carolina, he started his first career game.

=== Statistics ===
Season	Team	Games			Passing								Rushing			
Season	Team	GP	GS	Record	Cmp	Att	Pct	Yds	Y/A	TD	Int	Rtg	Att	Yds	Avg	TD
2017	Miami	0	0	—	Redshirted (redshirt)											
2018	Miami	11	6	4–2	97	191	50.8	1,091	5.7	13	6	114.9	61	169	2.8	1
2019	Miami	8	3	2–1	85	159	53.5	1,045	6.6	8	3	121.5	38	44	1.2	2
2020	Miami	5	0	—	26	47	55.3	348	7.4	3	1	134.3	12	4	0.3	0
2021	Florida Atlantic	12	12	5–7	210	345	60.9	2,771	8.0	20	7	143.4	107	148	1.4	4
2022	Florida Atlantic	12	12	5–7	215	371	58.0	2,712	7.3	25	5	138.9	91	259	2.8	6
Career		48	33	16−17	633	1,113	56.9	7,967	7.2	69	22	133.5	309	624	2.0	13

== Professional career ==
Pre-draft measurables
Height	Weight	Arm length	Hand span	Wingspan	40-yard dash	10-yard split	20-yard split	20-yard shuttle	Three-cone drill	Vertical jump	Broad jump
6 ft 2 1/2 in (1.89 m)	199 lb (90 kg)	31 5/8 in (0.80 m)	9 1/8 in (0.23 m)	6 ft 5 1/8 in (1.96 m)	4.70 s	1.71 s	2.67 s	4.52 s	7.50 s	35.0 in (0.89 m)	10 ft 2 in (3.10 m)
All values from Pro Day

=== Hamilton Tiger-Cats ===
Perry was signed by the Hamilton Tiger-Cats of the Canadian Football League (CFL) on June 23, 2023, after the team's starting quarterback Bo Levi Mitchell was placed on injured reserve. He was released on July 4, 2023.

=== Seattle Sea Dragons ===
The Seattle Sea Dragons claimed Perry's XFL player rights after going undrafted in their 2023 rookie draft on June 20, 2023. He was signed on October 25, 2023. The Sea Dragons folded when the XFL and USFL merged to create the United Football League (UFL).

=== Jacksonville Sharks ===
On April 17, 2024, Perry signed with the Jacksonville Sharks of the Indoor Football League.

=== Raiders Tirol ===
On June 14, 2024, Perry signed with the Raiders Tirol of the European League of Football. He was let go at the end of the season.

On June 4, 2025, Perry was re-signed after quarterback Conor Miller was placed on IR.

=== Louisville Kings ===
On February 25, 2026, Perry signed with the Louisville Kings of the United Football League.

== Career statistics ==
=== ELF ===
Season	Team	Games			Passing								Rushing			
Season	Team	GP	GS	Record	Cmp	Att	Pct	Yds	Y/A	TD	Int	Rtg	Att	Yds	Avg	TD
2024	Raiders	9	9	6–3	145	249	58.2	1,719	6.9	13	10	80.1	64	399	6.2	5
2025	Raiders	8	8	3–5	111	208	53.4	1,536	7.4	16	3	97.0	34	200	5.9	3
Career		17	17	9–8	256	457	56.0	3,255	7.1	29	13	87.7	98	599	6.1	8
