= Michael Pinckney =

American gridiron football player (born 1998)

Profile
- Position: Linebacker

Personal information
- Born: May 28, 1998 (age 28); Miami, Florida
- Listed height: 6 ft 1 in (1.85 m)
- Listed weight: 220 lb (100 kg)

Career information
- High school: William M. Raines High School (FL)
- College: Miami (FL)
- NFL draft: 2020: undrafted

Career history
- New England Patriots (2020)*; Chicago Bears (2021)*; Saskatchewan Roughriders (2021–2022)
- * Offseason or practice squad member only

Awards and highlights
- Freshman All-American (2016)
- Stats at Pro Football Reference

Michael Pinckney (born May 28, 1998) is an American football linebacker. He played college football for the Miami Hurricanes from 2016 to 2019. He signed with the New England Patriots as an undrafted free agent in 2020.

== College career ==
Pinckney was a three-star recruit coming out of William M. Raines High School in Jacksonville, Florida. He committed to Miami on January 11, 2016. Pinckney was one of the three freshman linebackers to start in 2016. He started in all 13 games of the season. He finished the season with 61 total tackles (7.5 for loss), 2.5 sacks and an interception. He was named a freshman all-American.

=== Statistics ===
Season	Team	GP	Defense					
Season	Team	GP	Tackles	TFL	Sack	Int	FF	FR
2016	Miami	13	61	7.5	2.5	1	0	0
2017	Miami	12	63	10.0	3.5	1	0	1
2018	Miami	12	74	11.0	3.5	1	0	0
Career		37	198	28.5	9.5	3	0	1

== Professional career ==
Pre-draft measurables
Height	Weight	Arm length	Hand span
5 ft 11 1/8 in (1.81 m)	235 lb (107 kg)	32 3/8 in (0.82 m)	10 in (0.25 m)
All values from NFL Combine

=== New England Patriots ===
After going undrafted, Pinckney was signed to the New England Patriots' practice squad on October 2, 2020. He was suspended by the NFL for six games on November 27, 2020. He was reinstated from suspension on January 4, 2021, and signed a reserve/future contract with the Patriots two days later. He was waived after the season on March 23, 2021.

=== Chicago Bears ===
On May 13, 2021, Pinckney signed with the Chicago Bears, but was waived three days later.

=== Saskatchewan Roughriders ===
Pinckney signed with the Saskatchewan Roughriders of the CFL on July 16, 2021, and the team subsequently placed him on the suspended list. He was activated on July 20.
