= Faith Academy (Mobile, Alabama) =

Location
- 8650 Tanner Williams Rd; Mobile, Alabama 36608; United States
- 30°42′11″N 88°14′42″W

Information
- Type: Private coeducational secondary
- Motto: To God Be The Glory
- Opened: 1969 (57 years ago)
- CEEB code: 010943
- NCES School ID: A9100128
- Principal: Barry Pickering
- Headmaster: Tim Skelton
- Grades: K-12
- Enrollment: 1720 (2016)
- Campus size: 53 acres (21 ha)
- Campus type: Suburban
- Colors: Maroon and white
- Mascot: Rambo the Ram
- Nickname: Rams
- Affiliation: Non-denominational
- Website: www.faithacademy.us

Faith Academy is an independent, religious, co-educational private school in Mobile, Alabama, United States. It received national attention from 2023-2026 when a guidance counselor and mandated reporter, Carrie Meredith, failed to report her knowledge that Jonathan Sauers, a 44 year old teacher and soccer coach, raped a 16 year old student. When Meredith was convicted, the school distributed a communication notifying parents that the school stood behind Carrie Meredith. This notification, which identified Carrie Meredith as a victim that all should keep in their prayers, made no mention of the 16 year old student who was raped.

The school was founded as Lott Road Christian Grade School in 1969, and was located in Eight Mile, Alabama for nineteen years until moving to its current location in 1988. The school changed its name during the 1971-1972 school year to reflect its emphasis on faith.

== School history ==
Faith Academy was first envisioned in early 1967 at a men's prayer meeting of Lott Road Baptist Church in Eight Mile, Alabama. Desiring to provide quality Christian education for white only children at a time when school desegregation was occurring in Alabama, they opened Lott Road Christian Grade School. The school was begun in a single, two-story building located behind the church in 1969. The school had 170 students in grades one through six and eight teachers. The name was changed to Faith Academy during the 1971-1972 school year.

The school grew rapidly; by the school year 1972-1973, enrollment increased to 547 students in grades one through twelve. Kindergarten was added in the 1975-1976 school year. Faith Academy remained in Eight Mile for nineteen years, but moved to the present site on Tanner Williams Road in Mobile, Alabama, in the summer of 1988. The enrollment remained at approximately 500 students in grades kindergarten through twelve. During the 1990-1991 school year, the school was accredited by the Alabama Independent School Association.

== Athletics ==
The Boys Basketball team has won five consecutive regionals, won three consecutive regional titles and three consecutive state semifinals. In 2015, the team won USA Today's Best Boys Basketball Program contest with over 568,000 votes. In 2014 and 2015, they have been ranked No. 1 in Class 5A.

The school's baseball team was coached by Lloyd Skoda for 29 non-consecutive years, who continues to teach other classes at the school. Skoda, who retired in 2013 after celebrating his 900th win, won 11 AISA state tiles at Faith and was inducted into the Alabama Baseball Association Hall of Fame in 2003. With a 2.2 million dollar baseball/softball facility, Faith has the top baseball facility in southeast Alabama.

Football is led by Lance Lawley, who took the reins after Gary Caldwell and Rusty Mason both stepped down. Faith football proved very successful in the AISA but has struggled since moving to the AHSAA. In 2003, Caldwell alongside head coach Robby James "helped transform the program from an AISA doormat into a state title contender," compiling 72-22 record in eight seasons under James. The Rams fell to 3-7 in 2008 in the first season as part of the AHSAA ranks, and James resigned in 2009. Caldwell was promoted to head coach but resigned after three consecutive losing seasons.

== Missions ==
In 2014, after ten years of planning, Faith Academy opened a school in Ghana, West Africa.

== Notable alumni ==
- Josh Donaldson — Major League Baseball third baseman
- Caullin Lacy — college football wide receiver for the Louisville Cardinals
- Malik Rosier — former college football quarterback
- Unique Thompson — American professional basketball player
- P.J. Walters — Major League Baseball pitcher
- Jalen Wayne (transferred after his junior year) — National Football League player
