= Jeff Thomas (wide receiver) =

American football player (born 1998)

Profile
- Position: Wide receiver

Personal information
- Born: June 17, 1998 (age 28); St. Louis, Missouri, U.S.
- Listed height: 5 ft 9 in (1.75 m)
- Listed weight: 174 lb (79 kg)

Career information
- High school: East St. Louis (East St. Louis, Illinois)
- College: Miami
- NFL draft: 2020: undrafted

Career history
- New England Patriots (2020)*; Pittsburgh Maulers (2022); Birmingham Stallions (2022); St. Louis Battlehawks (2024)
- * Offseason or practice squad member only
- Stats at Pro Football Reference

Jeff Thomas (born June 17, 1998) is an American football wide receiver. He played college football at the University of Miami and signed with the New England Patriots as an undrafted free agent in 2020.

== Early life ==
Thomas attended and played high school football at East St. Louis Senior High School from 2013 to 2016.

== College career ==
Thomas enrolled at the University of Miami on May 22, 2017, where he played from 2017 to 2019. Thomas finished with 17 receptions for 374 yards and two touchdowns his freshman season. Thomas improved on this his sophomore season, finishing with 35 receptions for 563 yards and three touchdowns, however his season was cut short when he was dismissed from the Miami team prior to week 12 after an argument with wide receivers coach Ron Dugans. After his dismissal from the team, Thomas looked to transfer to Illinois but wound up deciding to stay at Miami after head coach Mark Richt retired on December 30, 2018. Thomas played the majority of his junior year at Miami, finishing the season with 31 receptions for 379 yards and three touchdowns, however he was suspended weeks seven and eight due to a violation of team rules. Following his junior season, Thomas declared for the 2020 NFL draft.

=== College career statistics ===
			Receiving			
Year	School	GP	Rec	Yds	Avg	TD
2017	Miami	13	17	374	22.0	2
2018	Miami	11	35	563	16.1	3
2019	Miami	10	31	379	12.2	3
Career		34	83	1316	15.9	8

== Professional career ==
Pre-draft measurables
Height	Weight	Arm length	Hand span	40-yard dash	Vertical jump	Broad jump
5 ft 8 7/8 in (1.75 m)	170 lb (77 kg)	30 3/8 in (0.77 m)	8 3/8 in (0.21 m)	4.45 s	36.5 in (0.93 m)	10 ft 5 in (3.18 m)
All values from NFL draft

=== New England Patriots ===
Thomas signed with the New England Patriots as an undrafted free agent in 2020. On September 5, 2020, he was waived by the team during final roster cuts.

=== Pittsburgh Maulers ===
On February 23, 2022, Thomas was drafted in the 15th round of the 2022 USFL draft to the Pittsburgh Maulers. He was transferred to the team's inactive roster on April 22, 2022, due to a groin injury. He was transferred to the active roster on April 30. He was moved back to the inactive roster with a hamstring injury. He was released on May 19, 2022.

=== Birmingham Stallions ===
Thomas was claimed off waivers by the Birmingham Stallions on May 19, 2022, and subsequently moved to the inactive roster the next day. He was transferred to the active roster on May 21. On March 11, 2023, Thomas was released by the Stallions.

=== St. Louis Battlehawks ===
On January 19, 2024, Thomas signed with the St. Louis Battlehawks of the United Football League (UFL). He was released on April 15, 2024. He was re-signed on May 30.
