= Jarren Williams (quarterback) =

American football player

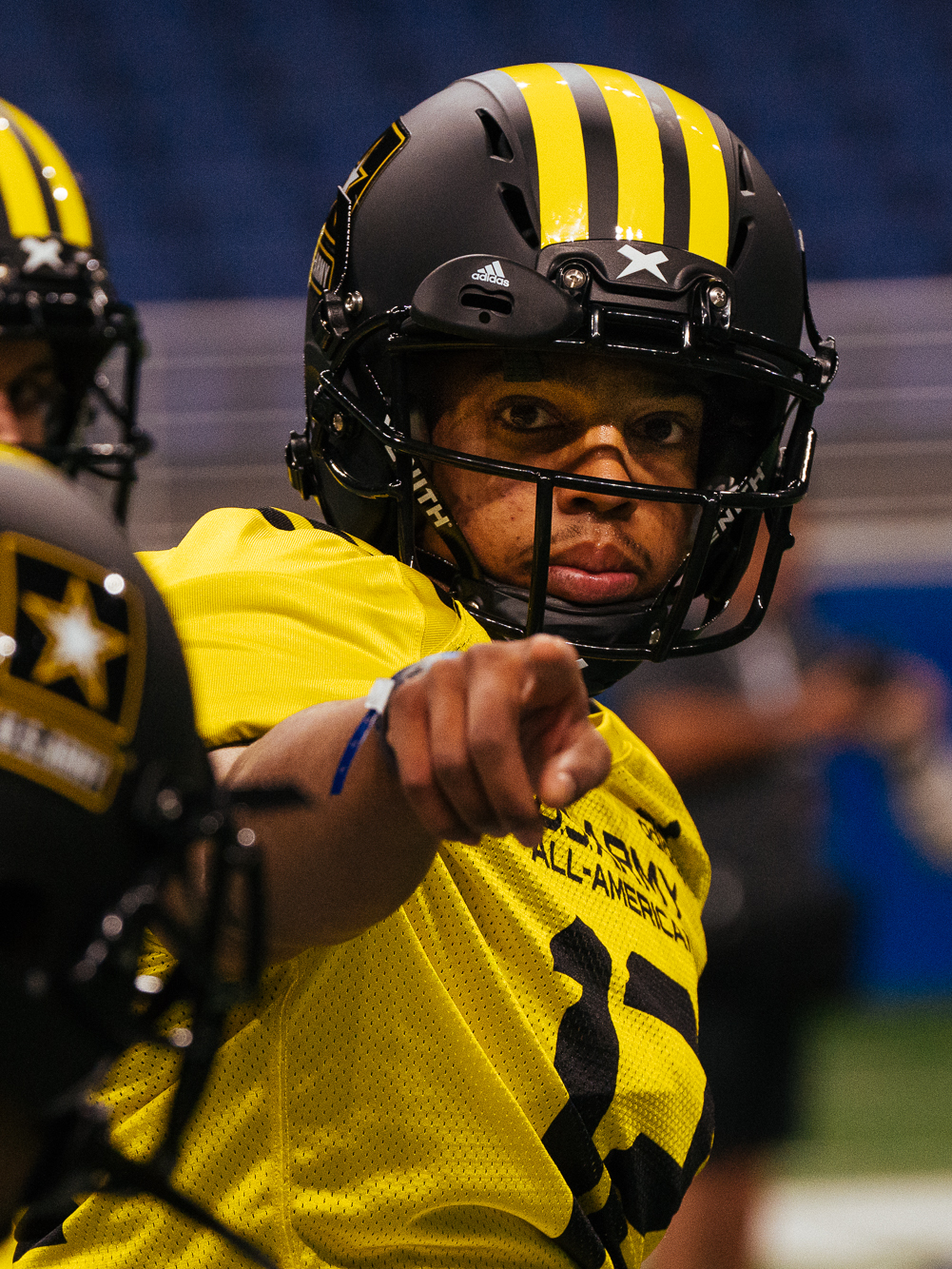
- Williams practicing for the 2018 U.S. Army All-American Bowl

Profile
- Position: Quarterback

Personal information
- Born: Lawrenceville, Georgia, U.S.
- Listed height: 6 ft 2 in (1.88 m)
- Listed weight: 210 lb (95 kg)

Career information
- High school: Central Gwinnett (Lawrenceville, Georgia)
- College: Miami (FL) (2018–2019); Garden City (2020); South Florida (2021); Alabama A&M (2022)
- Stats at ESPN

Jarren Williams is an American former football quarterback.

== Early life ==
Williams attended Central Gwinnett High School in Lawrenceville, Georgia. As a senior, he threw for over 3,000 yards with 28 touchdowns and four interceptions. He played in the 2018 Army All-American Bowl. He committed to the University of Miami to play college football.

== College career ==
In 2018, Williams only played in one game for Miami, but did not play significant snaps, and redshirted. As a redshirt freshman in 2019, he was named the Hurricanes starting quarterback. Against Louisville on November 9, 2019, he threw six touchdown passes.

In June 2020, Williams transferred to Garden City; however, fall junior college games were ultimately called off, due to the COVID-19 pandemic.

On December 16, 2020, Williams committed to South Florida.

On December 13, 2021, Williams committed to Alabama A&M.

He retired from football in June 2022.
