= Jaquan Johnson =

American football player (born 1995)

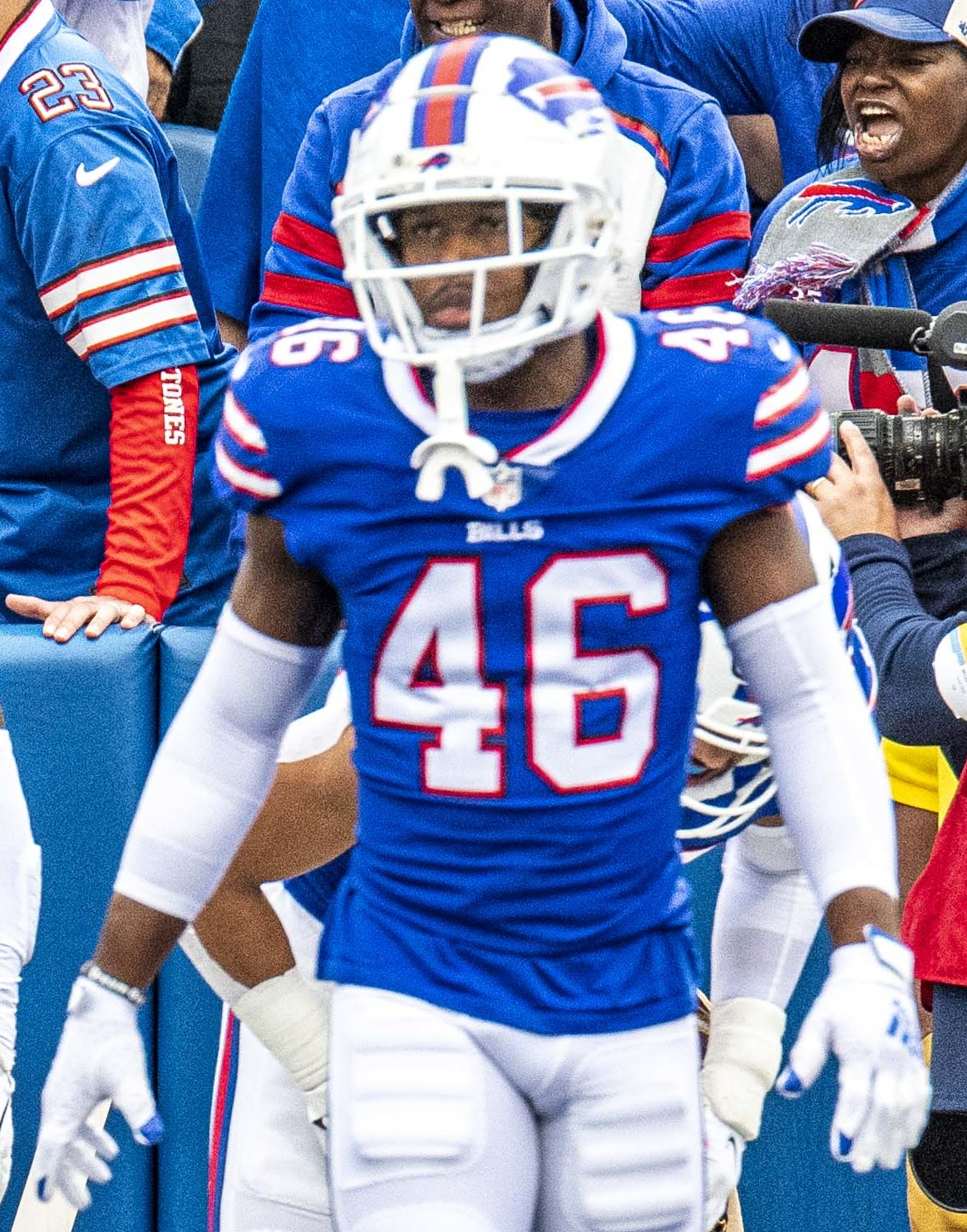
- Johnson with the Buffalo Bills in 2021

Profile
- Position: Safety

Personal information
- Born: November 13, 1995 (age 30); Miami, Florida, U.S.
- Listed height: 5 ft 10 in (1.78 m)
- Listed weight: 191 lb (87 kg)

Career information
- High school: Miami Killian
- College: Miami (FL) (2015–2018)
- NFL draft: 2019: 6th round, 181st overall pick

Career history
- Buffalo Bills (2019–2022); Las Vegas Raiders (2023)*; Tampa Bay Buccaneers (2023)*
- * Offseason or practice squad member only

Awards and highlights
- Second-team All-American (2017); 2× Second-team All-ACC (2017, 2018)

Career NFL statistics
- Total tackles: 58
- Pass deflections: 2
- Interceptions: 2
- Pass attempts: 1
- Completions: 1
- Passing yards: 13
- Stats at Pro Football Reference

Jaquan Johnson (born November 13, 1995) is an American professional football safety. He played college football for the Miami Hurricanes and was selected by the Buffalo Bills in the sixth round of the 2019 NFL draft.

== Early life ==
Johnson played on both sides of the ball at Miami Killian High School, playing defensive back and running back. He earned an invitation to the U. S. Army All-American Bowl after his senior season, and caught 13 interceptions throughout his high school career. Johnson committed to the University of Miami on August 19, 2014, flipping from previous frontrunner Florida State, which was his choice as late as two weeks before the commitment.

== College career ==
Stuck behind upperclassmen, Johnson was a reserve his first two years at the University of Miami.

As a junior, Johnson led the Hurricanes with 96 tackles. Late in the season, defensive coordinator Manny Diaz called him the "heart and soul" of the Hurricanes' defense. Johnson also made program history by becoming the first player to earn three consecutive Atlantic Coast Conference (ACC) Defensive Back of the Week awards, winning the accolade in the tenth, eleventh and twelfth weeks of the season. After the season, the team named Johnson its MVP.

Johnson decided to return to Miami for his senior year and even tried to persuade R. J. McIntosh and Kendrick Norton to stay, albeit unsuccessfully. Johnson cited getting his degree as a large factor in returning for his last season.

After his senior season, Johnson was named second-team All-ACC.

== Professional career ==
Pre-draft measurables
Height	Weight	Arm length	Hand span	40-yard dash	10-yard split	20-yard split	20-yard shuttle	Three-cone drill	Vertical jump	Broad jump	Bench press
5 ft 10 1/8 in (1.78 m)	191 lb (87 kg)	29 5/8 in (0.75 m)	8 3/4 in (0.22 m)	4.69 s	1.54 s	2.69 s	4.18 s	7.20 s	33.0 in (0.84 m)	10 ft 1 in (3.07 m)	18 reps
All values from NFL Combine/Pro Day

=== Buffalo Bills ===
Johnson was drafted by the Buffalo Bills in the sixth round with the 181st overall pick in the 2019 NFL draft. As a rookie, he appeared in 13 games in the regular season and had three total tackles.

In Week 16 of the 2020 season, Johnson recorded a 13-yard pass to Siran Neal in a 38–9 victory over the New England Patriots.

During Week 16 of the 2022 season, Johnson intercepted a Hail Mary pass off of Nathan Peterman.

=== Las Vegas Raiders ===
On March 21, 2023, Johnson signed a one-year contract with the Las Vegas Raiders. He was released on August 29.

=== Tampa Bay Buccaneers ===
On November 14, 2023, Johnson was signed to the practice squad of the Tampa Bay Buccaneers. He was released eight days later.

== Personal life ==
Johnson grew up as the middle child of seven in his family and struggled with poverty and hunger as a child, eventually moving into the house of a former flag football coach. He is a cousin of NFL running back Lamar Miller.
