= Nesta Jade Silvera =

American football player (born 2000)

Profile
- Position: Defensive tackle

Personal information
- Born: January 23, 2000 (age 26); Pembroke Pines, Florida, U.S.
- Listed height: 6 ft 2 in (1.88 m)
- Listed weight: 304 lb (138 kg)

Career information
- High school: American Heritage (Plantation, Florida)
- College: Miami (FL) (2018–2021); Arizona State (2022)
- NFL draft: 2023: 7th round, 231st overall pick

Career history
- Las Vegas Raiders (2023–2024); San Francisco 49ers (2024)*; Green Bay Packers (2025)*; Los Angeles Chargers (2025)*; St. Louis Battlehawks (2026)*
- * Offseason or practice squad member only

Career NFL statistics
- Total tackles: 10
- Stats at Pro Football Reference

Nesta Jade Silvera (born January 23, 2000) is an American professional football defensive tackle. He played college football for the Miami Hurricanes and Arizona State Sun Devils and was selected by the Raiders in the seventh round of the 2023 NFL draft.

== Early life ==
Silvera grew up in Pembroke Pines, Florida. He attended American Heritage School and helped them win back-to-back state championships and compile 27 straight wins. He was a consensus four-star recruit and compiled 79 tackles, 25 tackles-for-loss and 12 sacks as a senior, being named by USA Today the Florida High School Defensive Player of the Year. He was selected for the 2018 U.S. Army All-American Bowl and was ranked by 247Sports as the 54th-best prospect nationally. Silvera committed to play college football for the Miami Hurricanes over various other offers. Silvera is of Panamanian and Jamaican descent.

== College career ==
In his first season at Miami, Silvera appeared in 10 games and posted 13 tackles, 1.5 tackles-for-loss and a blocked punt. He missed the first four matches in 2019 due to an injury, but returned for the final nine and finished the year having totaled 19 tackles with a single sack. Silvera became a starter in 2020, appearing in 11 games, all but one of which he started, and recording 35 tackles with 8.0 tackles-for-loss, being named honorable mention all-conference. He remained a starter in 2021, tallying 38 tackles with 8.5 tackles-for-loss.

Silvera transferred to Arizona State for the 2022 season. In his only season there, he started 10 of the 12 games in which he appeared, making 56 tackles and 4.5 tackles-for-loss. He was invited to the NFL Scouting Combine after his graduation, being the only Arizona State player selected.

== Professional career ==
Pre-draft measurables
Height	Weight	Arm length	Hand span	40-yard dash	10-yard split	20-yard split	Vertical jump	Broad jump	Bench press
6 ft 2 in (1.88 m)	304 lb (138 kg)	32 7/8 in (0.84 m)	9 7/8 in (0.25 m)	5.16 s	1.77 s	2.93 s	29.5 in (0.75 m)	9 ft 2 in (2.79 m)	31 reps

=== Las Vegas Raiders ===
Silvera was selected by the Las Vegas Raiders in the seventh round (231st overall) of the 2023 NFL draft. He made his NFL debut in Week 4 of his rookie season, posting one tackle. He was released on December 20, 2023, and was re-signed to the practice squad two days later. He signed a reserve/future contract on January 8, 2024.

Silvera was waived by the Raiders on October 21, 2024.

=== San Francisco 49ers ===
On October 24, 2024, Silvera signed with the San Francisco 49ers practice squad.

=== Green Bay Packers ===
On January 14, 2025, Silvera signed a reserve/futures contract with the Green Bay Packers. He was released by the Packers on July 18, 2025.

=== Los Angeles Chargers ===
On August 4, 2025, Silvera signed with the Los Angeles Chargers. He was released on August 26, 2025, as part of final roster cuts.

=== St. Louis Battlehawks ===
On January 14, 2026, Silvera was selected by the St. Louis Battlehawks of the United Football League (UFL). He was released on March 19.
