= Malik Rosier =

American football player (born 1995)

No. 12
- Position: Quarterback

Personal information
- Born: October 18, 1995 (age 31); Mobile, Alabama
- Listed height: 6 ft 1 in (1.85 m)
- Listed weight: 216 lb (98 kg)

Career information
- High school: Faith Academy
- College: Miami (FL)
- NFL draft: 2019: undrafted

Malik Rosier Jr. (born October 18, 1995) (pronounced Rô-seer) is a former American football quarterback for the Miami Hurricanes.

== College career ==
Malik was a three-star dual-threat quarterback from Faith Academy in Mobile, Alabama. He decided to attend Miami. He redshirted in 2014, and was the backup of quarterback Brad Kaaya in 2015 and 2016. In 2017, Rosier was named the starter. He led the Canes to a 10–0 start and a #2 College Football Playoff ranking, with wins over Florida State, #13 Virginia Tech, and #3 Notre Dame. The win against rival FSU in Tallahassee broke a 7-game losing streak in the series, the first time the Canes had beaten the Seminoles since 2009. He returned as a starter in 2018.

Rosier also played baseball as a freshman at Miami in 2015.

=== College statistics ===
Games			Passing							Rushing		
Year	Team	GP	Cmp	Att	Pct	Yds	TD	Int	Rate	Yds	Avg	TDs
2015	Miami	6	29	57	50.9	338	2	3	101.7	−2	−0.1	0
2016	Miami	3	2	4	50.0	32	0	0	117.2	65	32.5	1
2017	Miami	13	224	415	54.0	3,120	26	14	131.1	468	3.6	5
2018	Miami	8	82	156	52.6	1,053	6	8	111.7	300	5.3	6
College totals		21	337	632	53.3	4,543	34	25	123.5	831	4.1	12

== Professional career ==
Rosier went undrafted during the 2019 NFL draft. On May 6, 2019, the Miami Dolphins invited Rosier to minicamp but wasn't signed by the team.
