= Kendrick Norton =

American football player (born 1997)

No. 74, 75
- Position: Defensive tackle

Personal information
- Born: June 7, 1997 (age 29); Jacksonville, Florida, U.S.
- Listed height: 6 ft 3 in (1.91 m)
- Listed weight: 314 lb (142 kg)

Career information
- High school: Trinity Christian Academy (Jacksonville)
- College: Miami (FL)
- NFL draft: 2018: 7th round, 242nd overall pick

Career history
- Carolina Panthers (2018)*; Miami Dolphins (2018–2019)
- * Offseason or practice squad member only
- Stats at Pro Football Reference

Kendrick Norton Jr. (born June 7, 1997) is an American former professional football player who was a defensive tackle in the National Football League (NFL). He played college football for the Miami Hurricanes. He was critically injured after being involved in a car accident in July 2019 that caused his left arm to be amputated and effectively ended his NFL career.

== College career ==
At the University of Miami, Norton earned honorable mention All-Atlantic Coast Conference honors at the conclusion of the 2017 season. He played in all 13 games for the Hurricanes, starting 12 in his junior year, making 26 tackles, 6.5 for loss, and two sacks. Norton was a third-team all-conference selection the previous season, starting all 13 games, compiling 39 tackles, 10 for loss, and two sacks in the middle of the 'Canes defense. The four-star recruit and Under Armour All-American from Jacksonville played in 12 games as a true freshman in 2015, posting 19 tackles and a sack.

== Professional career ==
Pre-draft measurables
Height	Weight	Arm length	Hand span	40-yard dash	10-yard split	20-yard split	20-yard shuttle	Three-cone drill	Vertical jump	Broad jump	Bench press
6 ft 2 7/8 in (1.90 m)	314 lb (142 kg)	33 3/4 in (0.86 m)	10 3/4 in (0.27 m)	5.25 s	1.79 s	3.01 s	4.91 s	7.86 s	29.5 in (0.75 m)	8 ft 3 in (2.51 m)	30 reps

=== Carolina Panthers ===
Norton was selected by the Carolina Panthers in the seventh round (242nd overall) of the 2018 NFL draft. He was waived on September 1, 2018, and was signed to the practice squad the next day. He was released on September 6, 2018, but was re-signed four days later.

=== Miami Dolphins ===
On December 19, 2018, Norton was signed by the Miami Dolphins off the Panthers practice squad.

On July 22, 2019, the Dolphins waived Norton with a non-football injury designation, but decided to give him a full-season salary. He reverted to the team's reserve/non-football injury list on July 23.

Norton was waived with a non-football injury designation again on March 18, 2020.

== Personal life ==
On July 4, 2019, Norton was involved in a car accident while driving on State Road 836, near Miami. He almost died after sustaining multiple injuries that caused his left arm to be amputated at the scene of the accident. Two days later, the league announced that his medical bills would be covered by a combination of both the league and the Dolphins' insurance.
