= Jonathan Ford (American football) =

American football player (born 1998)

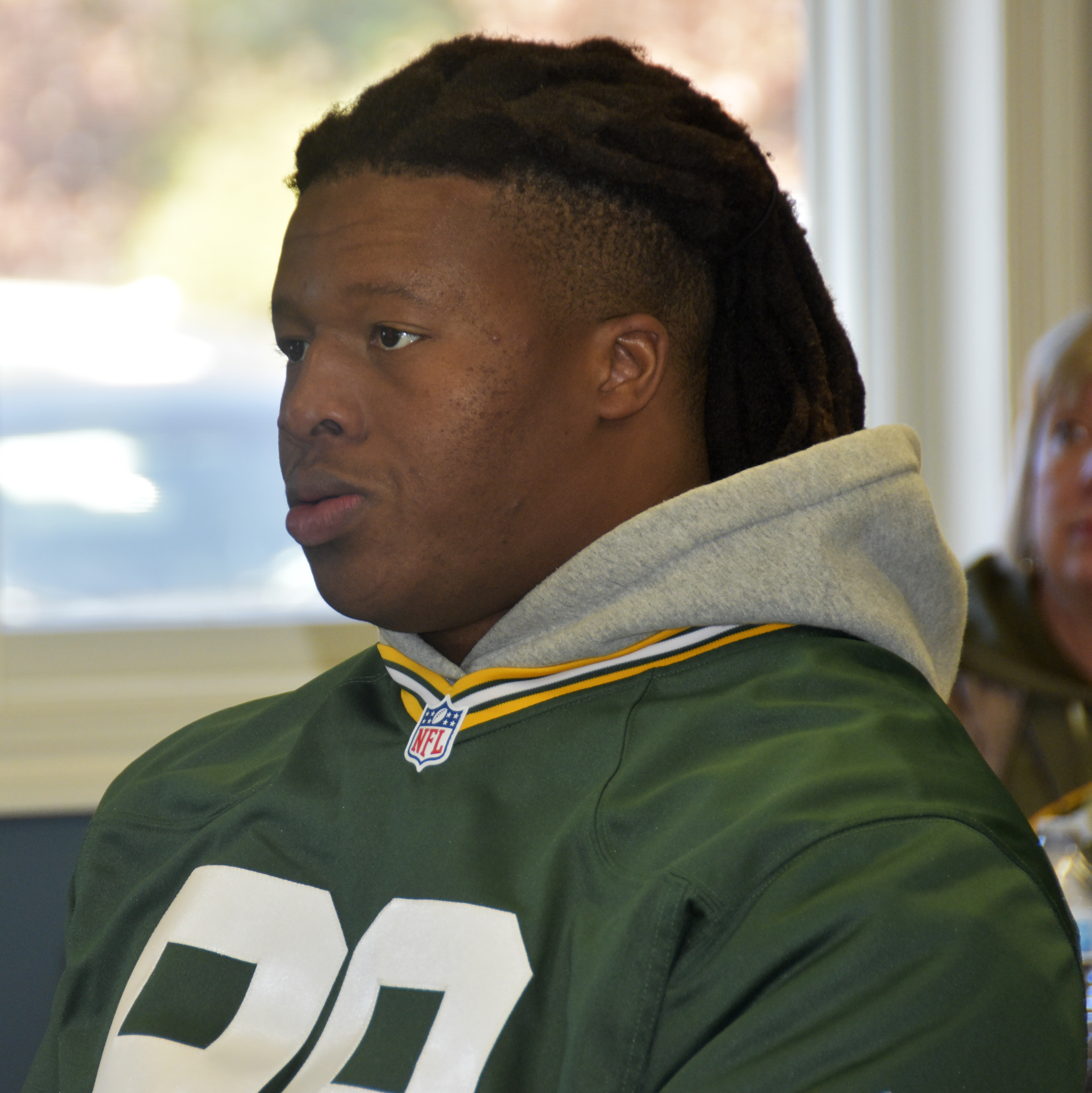
- Ford with the Green Bay Packers in 2022

No. 96 – Green Bay Packers
- Position: Defensive tackle
- Roster status: Injured reserve

Personal information
- Born: September 29, 1998 (age 28); Fort Lauderdale, Florida, U.S.
- Listed height: 6 ft 5 in (1.96 m)
- Listed weight: 338 lb (153 kg)

Career information
- High school: Dillard (Fort Lauderdale)
- College: Miami (FL) (2017–2021)
- NFL draft: 2022: 7th round, 234th overall pick

Career history
- Green Bay Packers (2022–2024); Chicago Bears (2024–2025); Green Bay Packers (2025–present)

Career NFL statistics as of 2026
- Tackles: 20
- Sacks: 0.5
- Stats at Pro Football Reference

Jonathan Terell Ford (born September 29, 1998) is an American professional football defensive tackle for the Green Bay Packers of the National Football League (NFL). He played college football for the Miami Hurricanes.

== Professional career ==
Pre-draft measurables
Height	Weight	Arm length	Hand span	Wingspan	40-yard dash	10-yard split	20-yard split	20-yard shuttle	Vertical jump	Broad jump	Bench press
6 ft 5 1/8 in (1.96 m)	333 lb (151 kg)	32 3/4 in (0.83 m)	9 1/4 in (0.23 m)	6 ft 7 5/8 in (2.02 m)	5.49 s	1.84 s	3.06 s	5.00 s	29.0 in (0.74 m)	8 ft 6 in (2.59 m)	24 reps
All values from NFL Combine/Pro Day

=== Green Bay Packers ===
Ford was selected by the Green Bay Packers in the seventh round (234th overall) of the 2022 NFL draft. He signed his rookie contract on May 6, 2022. He made the Packers' initial 53-man roster following his first training camp, but remained inactive for the entire 2022 season.

On August 30, 2023, Ford was waived by the Packers but re-signed to the practice squad a day later. He signed a reserve/future contract with the Packers on January 22, 2024.

On August 27, 2024, Ford was placed on injured reserve to begin the season. He was activated on October 21, then released and re-signed to the practice squad.

=== Chicago Bears ===
On December 11, 2024, Ford was signed by the Chicago Bears off the Packers practice squad.

On April 8, 2025, Ford signed his exclusive rights free agent contract with the Bears. He was waived on August 26 as part of final roster cuts and re-signed to the practice squad the next day. Ford was promoted to the active roster on October 25. He was waived on December 27.

=== Green Bay Packers (second stint) ===
On December 30, 2025, Ford was claimed off waivers by the Green Bay Packers.

On March 11, 2026, Ford re-signed with the Packers. He was placed on injured reserve on October 17, 2026.

== Career statistics ==
Legend
**Bold**	Career high

=== Regular season ===
Year	Team	Games		Tackles					Fumbles		
Year	Team	GP	GS	Total	Solo	Ast	Sck	TFL	FF	FR	PD
2024	CHI	4	0	**9**	**3**	**6**	0.0	**1**	0	0	0
2025	CHI	**8**	0	4	0	4	0.0	0	0	0	0
2025	GB	1	0	2	2	0	0.0	0	0	0	0
Career		13	0	15	5	10	0.0	1	0	0	0
Source: pro-football-reference.com

=== Postseason ===
Year	Team	Games		Tackles					Fumbles		
Year	Team	GP	GS	Total	Solo	Ast	Sck	TFL	FF	FR	PD
2025	GB	1	0	3	1	2	0.0	0	0	0	0
Career		1	0	3	1	2	0.0	0	0	0	0
Source: pro-football-reference.com
