= Jonathan Garvin =

American football player (born 1999)

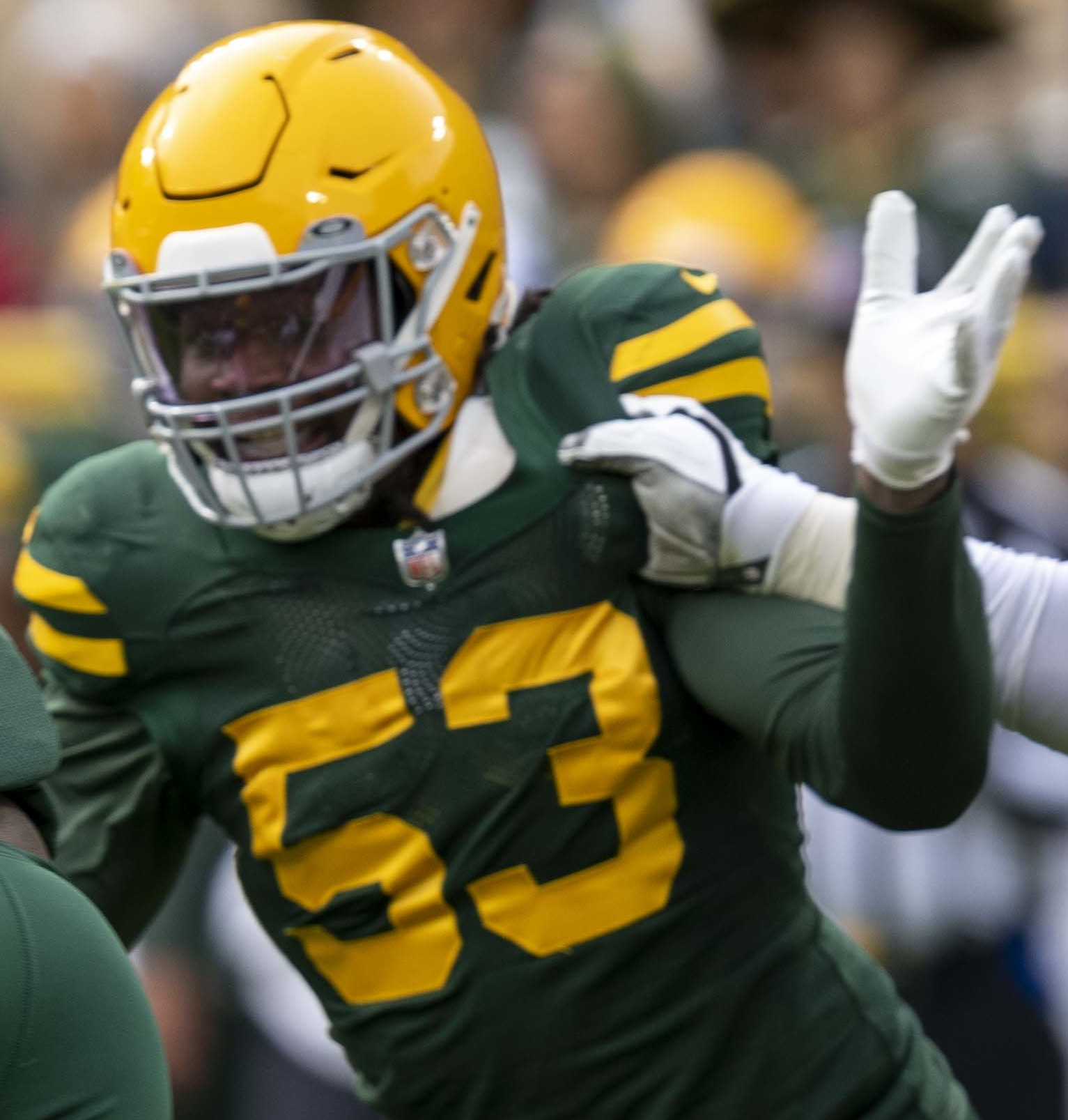
- Garvin with the Green Bay Packers in 2021

Profile
- Position: Defensive end

Personal information
- Born: July 28, 1999 (age 27); Lake Worth Beach, Florida, U.S.
- Listed height: 6 ft 4 in (1.93 m)
- Listed weight: 257 lb (117 kg)

Career information
- High school: Lake Worth Beach (FL)
- College: Miami (2017–2019)
- NFL draft: 2020: 7th round, 242nd overall pick

Career history
- Green Bay Packers (2020–2022); Birmingham Stallions (2024); San Francisco 49ers (2024–2025)*; Chicago Bears (2025–2026)*
- * Offseason or practice squad member only

Awards and highlights
- UFL champion (2024)

Career NFL statistics as of 2025
- Total tackles: 32
- Sacks: 1.5
- Pass deflections: 2
- Stats at Pro Football Reference

Jonathan Neo Darnell Garvin (born July 28, 1999) is an American professional football defensive end. He played college football for the Miami Hurricanes.

== College career ==
In 2018, Garvin tallied 60 tackles, 17 tackles for loss, 5.5 sacks, two fumble recoveries, five pass breakups, and a touchdown on a fumble return in 13 starts for the University of Miami. During his junior season, his production declined due to the emergence of defensive end Gregory Rousseau. Garvin had 26 tackles for loss and 10.5 sacks in his sophomore and junior seasons at Miami. In the regular season finale of his senior year against Duke, Garvin tallied a game-high 10 tackles, two sacks, 3 1/2 tackles for loss and a forced fumble.

After his junior season, he decided to forgo his senior season and enter the 2020 NFL draft.

== Professional career ==
Pre-draft measurables
Height	Weight	Arm length	Hand span	Wingspan	40-yard dash	10-yard split	20-yard split	Vertical jump	Broad jump	Bench press
6 ft 4 1/8 in (1.93 m)	263 lb (119 kg)	34 in (0.86 m)	9 5/8 in (0.24 m)	6 ft 8 1/4 in (2.04 m)	4.82 s	1.67 s	2.77 s	36.0 in (0.91 m)	10 ft 5 in (3.18 m)	23 reps
All values from NFL Combine

=== Green Bay Packers ===
Garvin was selected by the Green Bay Packers in the seventh round with the 242nd overall pick in the 2020 NFL draft. He was signed on May 26, 2020.

On November 24, 2021, Garvin was placed on reserve/COVID-19 list. He was activated on December 4.

On July 28, 2023, Garvin was released by the Packers.

=== Birmingham Stallions ===
Garvin signed with the Birmingham Stallions of the UFL on March 14, 2024. His contract was terminated on August 8.

=== San Francisco 49ers ===
On August 9, 2024, Garvin signed with the San Francisco 49ers. He was waived on August 27, and re-signed to the practice squad. He was released on September 11. Garvin was signed to the practice squad on October 2 and released again on October 24. On November 20, Garvin was re-signed to the practice squad.

Garvin signed a reserve/future contract with San Francisco on January 6, 2025. On August 26, Garvin was released by the 49ers as a part of final roster cuts.

=== Chicago Bears ===
On October 29, 2025, Garvin signed with the Chicago Bears' practice squad. On January 20, 2026, he signed a reserve/futures contract with Chicago.

Garvin was placed on injured reserve on August 4, 2026. He was waived from injured reserve on October 12.

== NFL career statistics ==
=== Regular season ===
Year	Team	GP	GS	Tackles					Interceptions						Fumbles	
Year	Team	GP	GS	Total	Solo	Ast	Sck	SFTY	PDef	Int	Yds	Avg	Lng	TDs	FF	FR
2020	GB	8	0	5	2	3	0.0	0	0	0	0	0.0	0	0	0	0
2021	GB	16	1	19	15	4	1.5	0	0	0	0	0.0	0	0	0	0
2022	GB	14	0	8	0	8	0.0	0	2	0	0	0.0	0	0	0	0
Total		38	1	32	17	15	1.5	0	2	0	0	0.0	0	0	0	0
Source: pro-football-reference.com
