= Mike Harley Jr. =

American football player (born 1997)

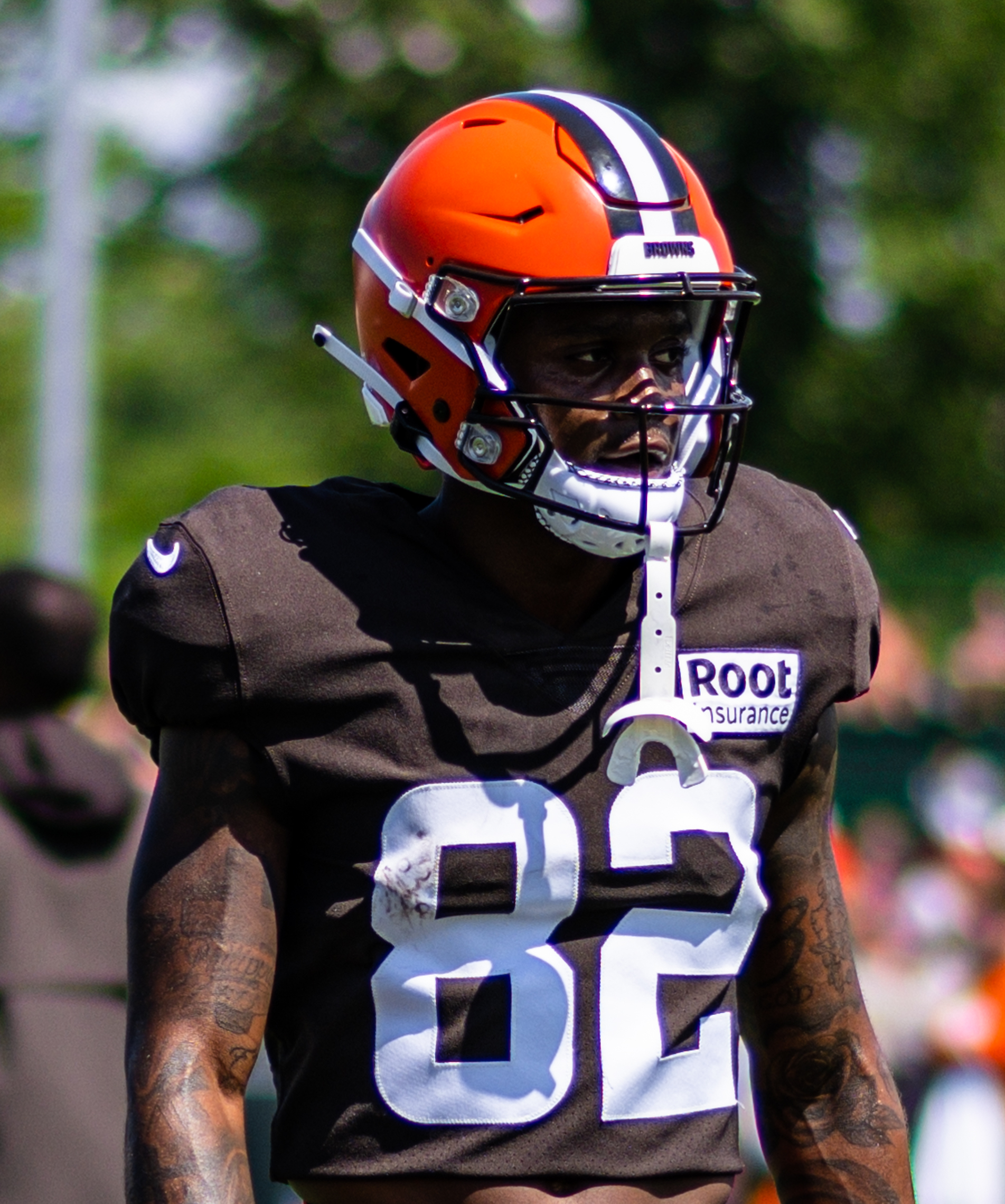
- Harley with the Cleveland Browns in 2022

No. 5 – Panthers Wrocław
- Position: Wide receiver

Personal information
- Born: December 13, 1997 (age 28); Fort Lauderdale, Florida, U.S.
- Listed height: 5 ft 10 in (1.78 m)
- Listed weight: 180 lb (82 kg)

Career information
- High school: St. Thomas Aquinas (FL)
- College: Miami (FL) (2017–2021)
- NFL draft: 2022: undrafted

Career history
- Cleveland Browns (2022–2023)*; DC Defenders (2024)*; Miami Dolphins (2024)*; Calgary Stampeders (2024)*; Stuttgart Surge (2025); Panthers Wrocław (2026–present)
- * Offseason or practice squad member only

Awards and highlights
- ELF champion (2025)
- Stats at Pro Football Reference

Michael Harley Jr. (born December 13, 1997) is an American professional football wide receiver for the Panthers Wrocław of the American Football League Europe (AFLE). He played college football at Miami (FL).

== Professional career ==
Pre-draft measurables
Height	Weight	Arm length	Hand span	40-yard dash	10-yard split	20-yard split	20-yard shuttle	Three-cone drill	Vertical jump	Broad jump	Bench press
5 ft 10 in (1.78 m)	179 lb (81 kg)	30 5/8 in (0.78 m)	8 5/8 in (0.22 m)	4.47 s	1.58 s	2.59 s	4.20 s	7.07 s	35.5 in (0.90 m)	10 ft 2 in (3.10 m)	16 reps
All values from Pro Day

=== Cleveland Browns ===
Harley went undrafted in the 2022 NFL draft and signed with the Browns as an undrafted free agent. On August 30, 2022, he was waived by the Browns, but later re-signed to the team's practice squad.

Harley signed a reserve/future contract with the Browns on January 9, 2023. He was waived on August 29, 2023.

=== DC Defenders ===
On March 4, 2024, Harley signed with the DC Defenders of the United Football League (UFL). He was released on March 10, 2024.

=== Miami Dolphins ===
On August 7, 2024, Harley signed with the Miami Dolphins. He was waived on August 27.

=== Calgary Stampeders ===
Harley was signed to the practice roster of the Calgary Stampeders of the Canadian Football League on October 2, 2024. He signed a futures contract with the team on October 27, 2024. He was released on May 14, 2025.
