= Sheldrick Redwine =

American football player (born 1996)

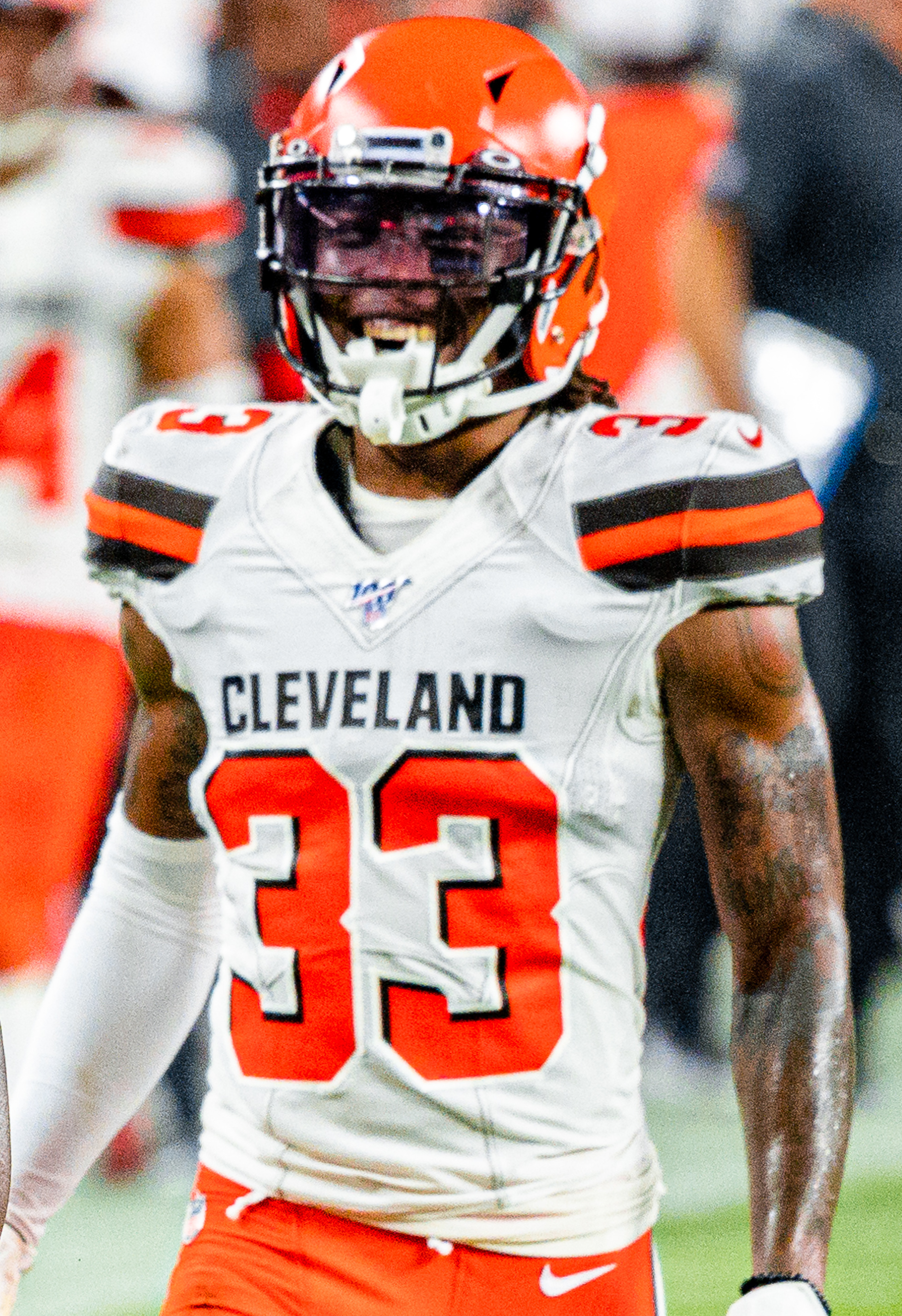
- Redwine with the Cleveland Browns in 2019

No. 20, 29, 31, 36
- Position: Safety

Personal information
- Born: November 6, 1996 (age 29); Miami, Florida, U.S.
- Listed height: 6 ft 0 in (1.83 m)
- Listed weight: 196 lb (89 kg)

Career information
- High school: Miami Killian
- College: Miami (FL) (2015–2018)
- NFL draft: 2019: 4th round, 119th overall pick

Career history
- Cleveland Browns (2019–2020); New York Jets (2021); Carolina Panthers (2021)*; Miami Dolphins (2021); Indianapolis Colts (2022)*; Dallas Cowboys (2022–2023); Washington Commanders (2024)*; Saskatchewan Roughriders (2025)
- * Offseason or practice squad member only

Awards and highlights
- Grey Cup champion (2025)

Career NFL statistics
- Tackles: 77
- Sacks: 0.5
- Pass deflections: 3
- Interceptions: 1
- Stats at Pro Football Reference

Sheldrick Darell Redwine (born November 6, 1996) is an American former professional football player who was a safety in the National Football League (NFL) and Canadian Football League (CFL). He played college football for the Miami Hurricanes and was selected by the Cleveland Browns in the fourth round of the 2019 NFL draft. Redwine was also a member of the New York Jets, Carolina Panthers, Miami Dolphins, Indianapolis Colts, Dallas Cowboys, Washington Commanders, and Saskatchewan Roughriders.

== Professional career ==
Pre-draft measurables
Height	Weight	Arm length	Hand span	40-yard dash	10-yard split	20-yard split	20-yard shuttle	Three-cone drill	Vertical jump	Broad jump	Bench press
6 ft 0 in (1.83 m)	196 lb (89 kg)	31 3/4 in (0.81 m)	9 3/8 in (0.24 m)	4.44 s	1.50 s	2.56 s	4.14 s	7.11 s	39.0 in (0.99 m)	10 ft 10 in (3.30 m)	10 reps
All values from NFL Combine/Pro Day

=== Cleveland Browns ===
Redwine was selected by the Cleveland Browns in the fourth round (119th overall) of the 2019 NFL draft. He signed his rookie contract with the Browns on May 2, 2019.

In Week 5 of the 2020 season against the Indianapolis Colts, Redwine recorded his first career interception off a pass thrown by Philip Rivers during the 32–23 win.

In the Wild Card round of the playoffs against the Pittsburgh Steelers, Redwine intercepted a pass thrown by Ben Roethlisberger during the 48–37 win.

Redwine was waived by the Browns on August 31, 2021.

=== New York Jets ===
On September 6, 2021, Redwine signed with the New York Jets. On September 21, he was waived by the Jets and subsequently re-signed to the practice squad. Redwine was released from the practice squad on October 12.

=== Carolina Panthers ===
On October 14, 2021, Redwine was signed to the Carolina Panthers' practice squad.

=== Miami Dolphins ===
On October 26, 2021, Redwine was signed off the Panthers' practice squad by the Miami Dolphins. He was waived on November 16 and re-signed to the practice squad. Redwine was promoted to the active roster on December 20.

On March 21, 2022, Redwine re-signed with the Dolphins. He was waived by Miami on August 23.

=== Indianapolis Colts ===
On January 3, 2023, Redwine was signed to the Indianapolis Colts' practice squad.

=== Dallas Cowboys ===
On January 19, 2023, Redwine was signed to the Dallas Cowboys' practice squad. He signed a reserve/future contract with Dallas on January 23. Redwine was waived on August 29, and re-signed to the practice squad. He signed a reserve/future contract with the Cowboys on January 15, 2024. Redwine was waived by the Cowboys on August 20.

=== Washington Commanders ===
On August 22, 2024, Redwine was signed by the Washington Commanders. He was released on August 27, as part of final roster cuts. Redwine re-signed with the team's practice squad on October 1, but was released again on October 22.

=== Saskatchewan Roughriders ===
On September 14, 2025, Redwine signed with the Saskatchewan Roughriders of the Canadian Football League.

On May 2, 2026, Redwine announced his retirement from professional football.
