= Tyler Gauthier =

American football player (born 1997)

Profile
- Position: Center

Personal information
- Born: June 29, 1997 (age 29); Nokomis, Florida, U.S.
- Listed height: 6 ft 5 in (1.96 m)
- Listed weight: 300 lb (136 kg)

Career information
- High school: Venice (Venice, Florida)
- College: Miami (FL)
- NFL draft: 2019: undrafted

Career history
- New England Patriots (2019)*; Jacksonville Jaguars (2019); New England Patriots (2020)*; Miami Dolphins (2020–2021)*; Buffalo Bills (2021)*; Washington Football Team (2021)*
- * Offseason or practice squad member only
- Stats at Pro Football Reference

Tyler Gauthier (born June 29, 1997) is an American professional football center. He played college football for the Miami Hurricanes and signed with the New England Patriots as an undrafted free agent in 2019.

== College career ==
Gauthier played college football for the Miami Hurricanes. During his time with the Hurricanes, he started 29 consecutive games and was named All-ACC Honorable Mention in 2017.

== Professional career ==
Pre-draft measurables
Height	Weight	Arm length	Hand span	Wingspan	40-yard dash	10-yard split	20-yard split	Vertical jump	Broad jump	Bench press
6 ft 4 in (1.93 m)	311 lb (141 kg)	32 in (0.81 m)	9 7/8 in (0.25 m)	6 ft 5 3/8 in (1.97 m)	5.24 s	1.86 s	3.03 s	30.0 in (0.76 m)	8 ft 8 in (2.64 m)	27 reps
All values from Pro Day

=== New England Patriots ===
Gauthier went undrafted in the 2019 NFL draft, and signed with the New England Patriots. After being waived as part of final roster cuts, and later signed to the Patriots practice squad on October 15, 2019. Gauthier was also drafted by the St. Louis BattleHawks of the XFL on the same day.

=== Jacksonville Jaguars ===
On December 10, 2019, Gauthier was signed by the Jacksonville Jaguars off the Patriots practice squad. He was waived on August 8, 2020.

=== New England Patriots (second stint) ===
Gauthier re-signed with the Patriots on August 12, 2020. He was waived on September 5, 2020.

=== Miami Dolphins ===
On September 16, 2020, Gauthier was signed to the Miami Dolphins' practice squad. He signed a reserve/future contract with the Dolphins on January 5, 2021. He was waived on July 16, 2021.

=== Buffalo Bills ===
Gauthier signed with the Buffalo Bills on July 30, 2021, but was waived on August 24, 2021.

=== Washington Football Team ===
Gauthier signed with the practice squad of the Washington Football Team on November 24, 2021, but was released two days later.
