= Health District (Miami) =

Health District Civic Center
- Neighborhood of Miami
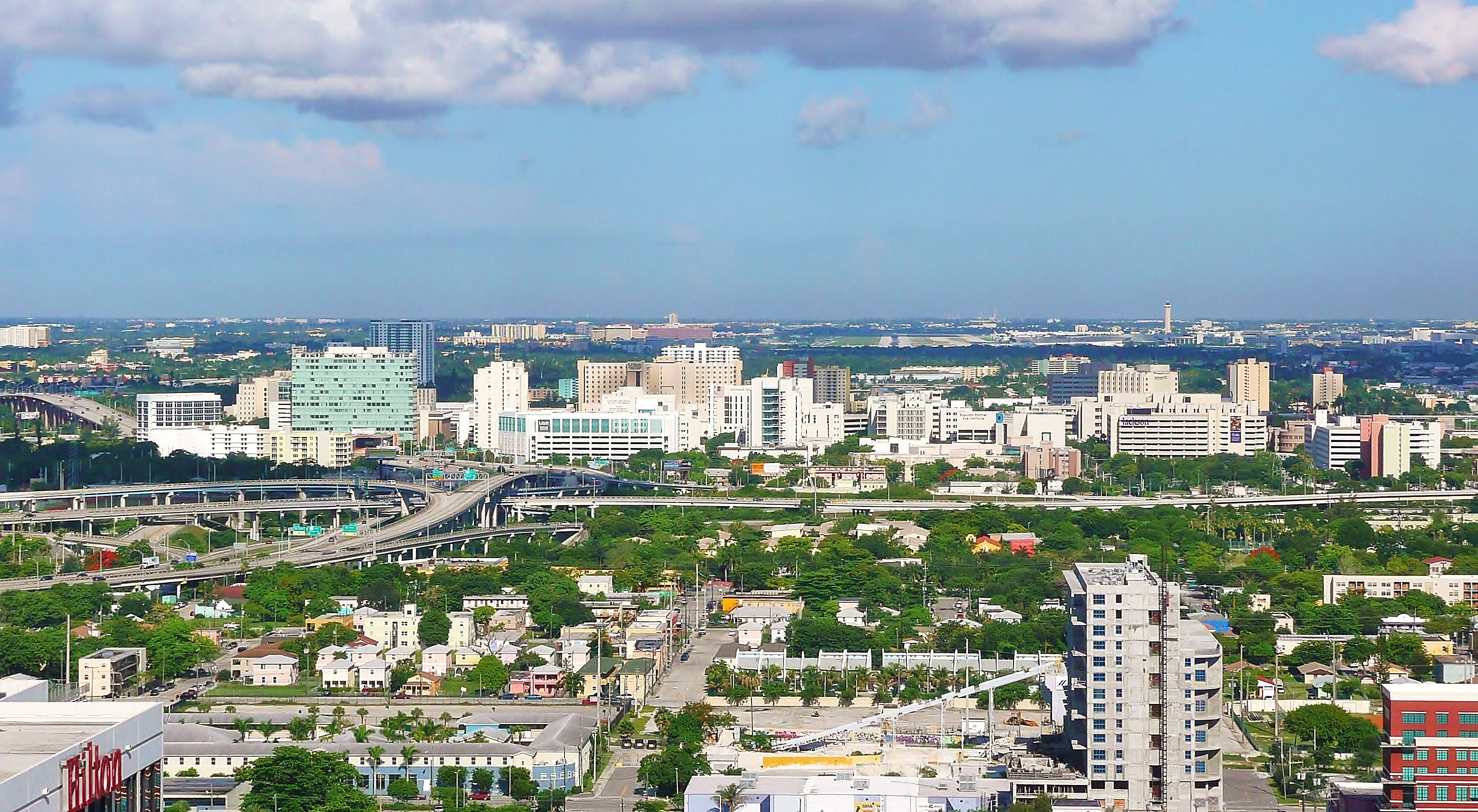
- Miami's Health District with the Midtown Interchange (foreground) and Miami International Airport (background) in June 2010

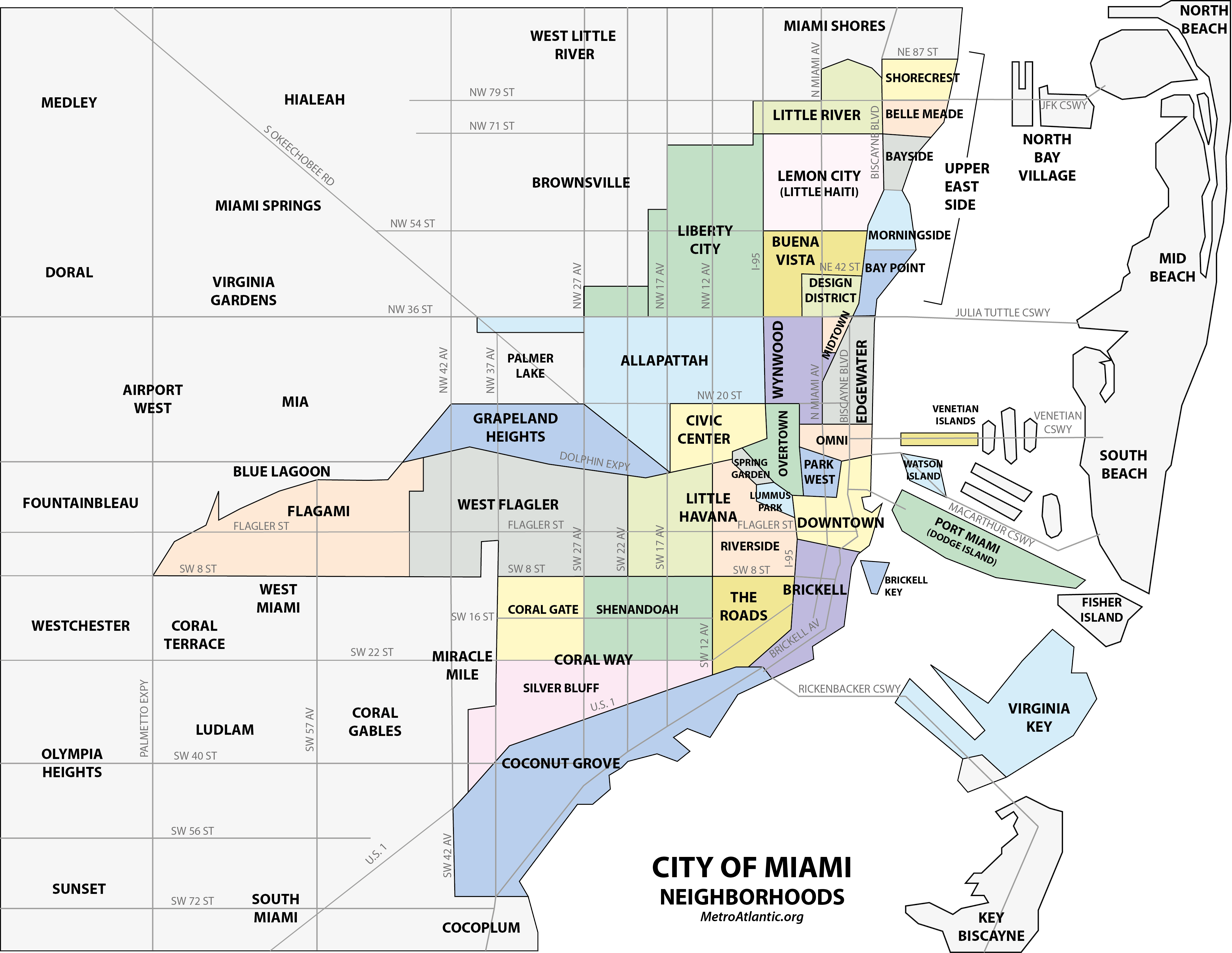
- Health District ("Civic Center") within the City of Miami
- Country: United States
- State: Florida
- County: Miami-Dade County
- City: Miami

Government
  - City of Miami Commissioner: Richard Dunn
  - Miami-Dade Commissioners: Audrey Edmonson
  - House of Representatives: Cynthia Stafford (D)
  - State Senate: Larcenia Bullard (D)
  - U.S. House: Frederica Wilson (D)

Population (2010)
  - Total: 2,705
  - Density: 5,565/sq mi (2,149/km^{2})
- Time zone: UTC-05 (EST)
- ZIP Code: 33136
- Area codes: 305, 786

The Health District, also known as the Civic Center, is a neighborhood in the city of Miami, Florida. The Health District is bound roughly by Northwest 20th Street and 14th Avenue to the northwest, the Dolphin Expressway and the Miami River to the south and west, and the Midtown Interchange and I-95 to the east.

The Health District has the country's second-largest concentration of medical and research facilities after Houston. The neighborhood is composed primarily of hospitals, research institutes, clinics and government offices, and is the center of Miami's growing biotechnology and medical research industry. It is the home of the University of Miami's Miller School of Medicine and the University of Miami's Life Science and Technology Park. The Health District is approximately five minutes north of downtown Miami via rapid transit on the Miami Metrorail.

== History ==
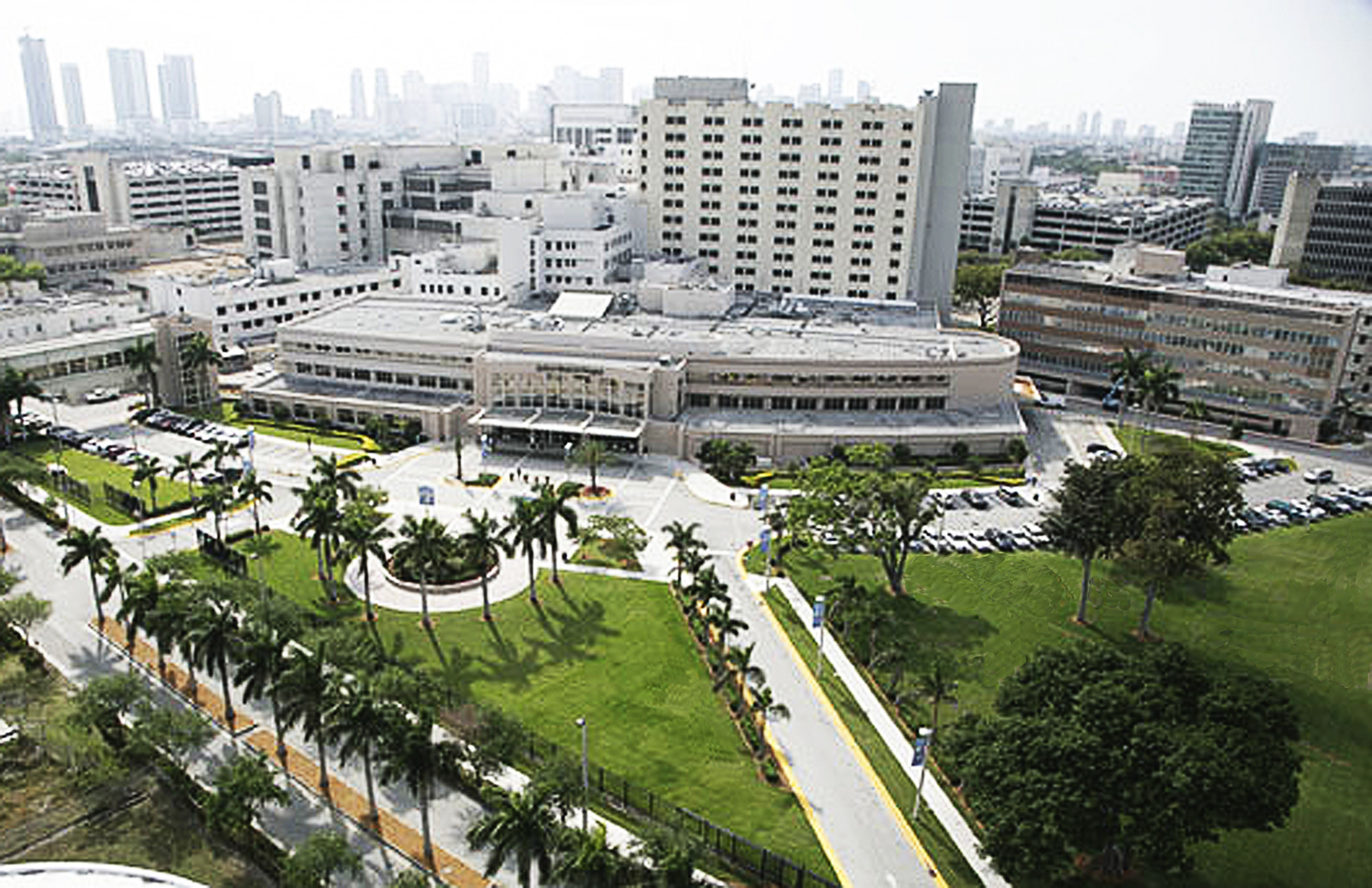
Jackson Memorial Hospital, the primary teaching hospital for the University of Miami's Miller School of Medicine and the largest hospital in the United States with 1,547 beds

The neighborhood has its roots as a health district with the opening of Jackson Memorial Hospital in 1915, with some of the original buildings, such as The Alamo still standing. Today, the Alamo serves an era museum of Jackson's history throughout the years. Jackson Memorial Hospital is the major public hospital of Miami, and Jackson's hospital in the Health District is the health system's primary hospital.

== Hospitals and research institutes ==
The Health District is the center of Miami's medical, research and biotechnology industries, and as such is home to many of the city's largest hospital systems. The largest is the public hospital, Jackson Memorial Hospital, which also has two branch hospitals in northern and southern Miami-Dade County. Jackson has affiliations as teaching hospitals with the University of Miami's Miller School of Medicine since 1952 and more recently with Florida International University's Herbert Wertheim College of Medicine. Other hospitals include: Miami VA Medical Center, University of Miami Hospital (aka UHealth Tower, previously Cedars Medical Center), and Holtz Children's Hospital.

Some of the research institutes in the Health District are:

- Bascom Palmer Eye Institute
- University of Miami Cytogenetic Lab
- University of Miami's Miller School of Medicine
- Miami Dade College Medical Campus
- Batchelor Children's Research Institute
- Braman Family Breast Cancer Institute
- Center on Aging
- Diabetes Research Institute
- John T MacDonald Foundation Department of Human Genetics
- Florida International University Wertheim College of Medicine
- Gordon Center for Research in Medical Education
- University of Miami Interdisciplinary Stem Cell Institute
- Mailman Center for Child Development
- Miami Institute for Human Genomics
- Miami Project to Cure Paralysis
- Sylvester Comprehensive Cancer Center
- Vascular Biology Institute
- William Lehman Injury Research Institute

== Demographics ==
As of 2025, Civic Center has a population of 3,155 residents, with 1,388 households. The median household income in 2020 was $25,608.

== Transportation ==
Civic Center is served by Metrobus throughout the area, and by the Miami Metrorail at:

- Civic Center station (NW 15th Street and 12th Avenue)
- Santa Clara station (NW 20th Street and 12th Avenue)

The Health District is served by Civic Center station, a station of the Metrorail rapid transit system. It connects directly to all the major hospitals and research centers, and connects the district to Downtown Miami, Dadeland, and Hialeah, as well as to Miami's commuter rail system, Tri-Rail. In March 2012, the new Miami Trolley system inaugurated its first route which passes through Civic Center on its way to Marlins Park.

== Education ==
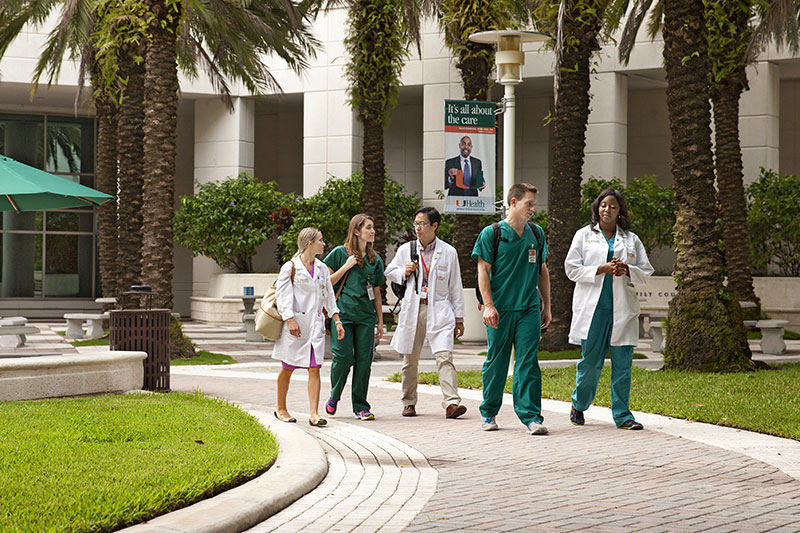
The University of Miami's Miller School of Medicine campus in the Health District in July 2016

=== Colleges and universities ===
- University of Miami's Miller School of Medicine, founded in 1952
- Miami Dade College – Medical Center Campus, opened in 1977
- Florida International University – Wertheim College of Medicine (teaching hospital at Jackson), opened in 2006

== Historic Civic Center ==
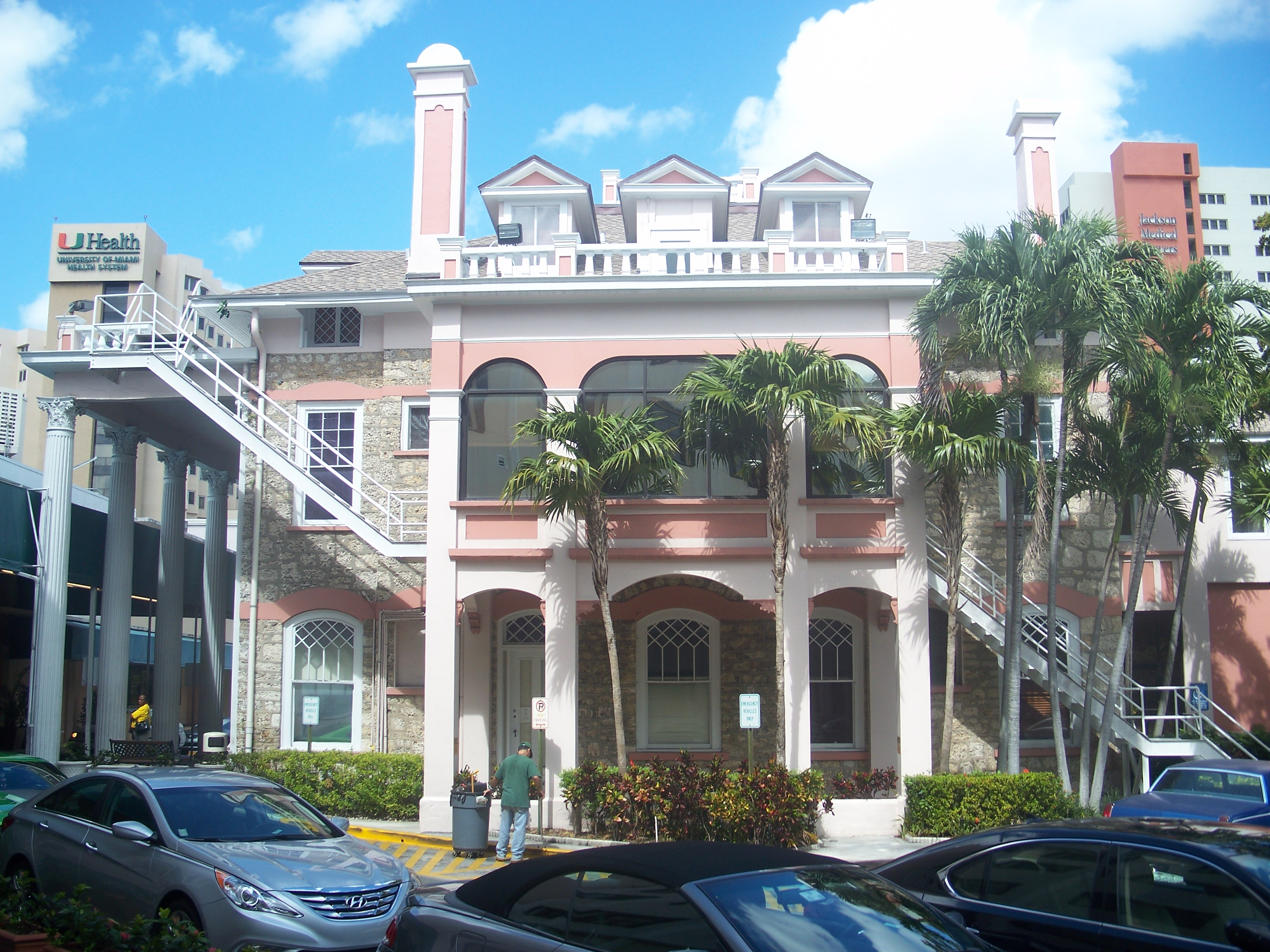
Halissee Hall, built in 1912

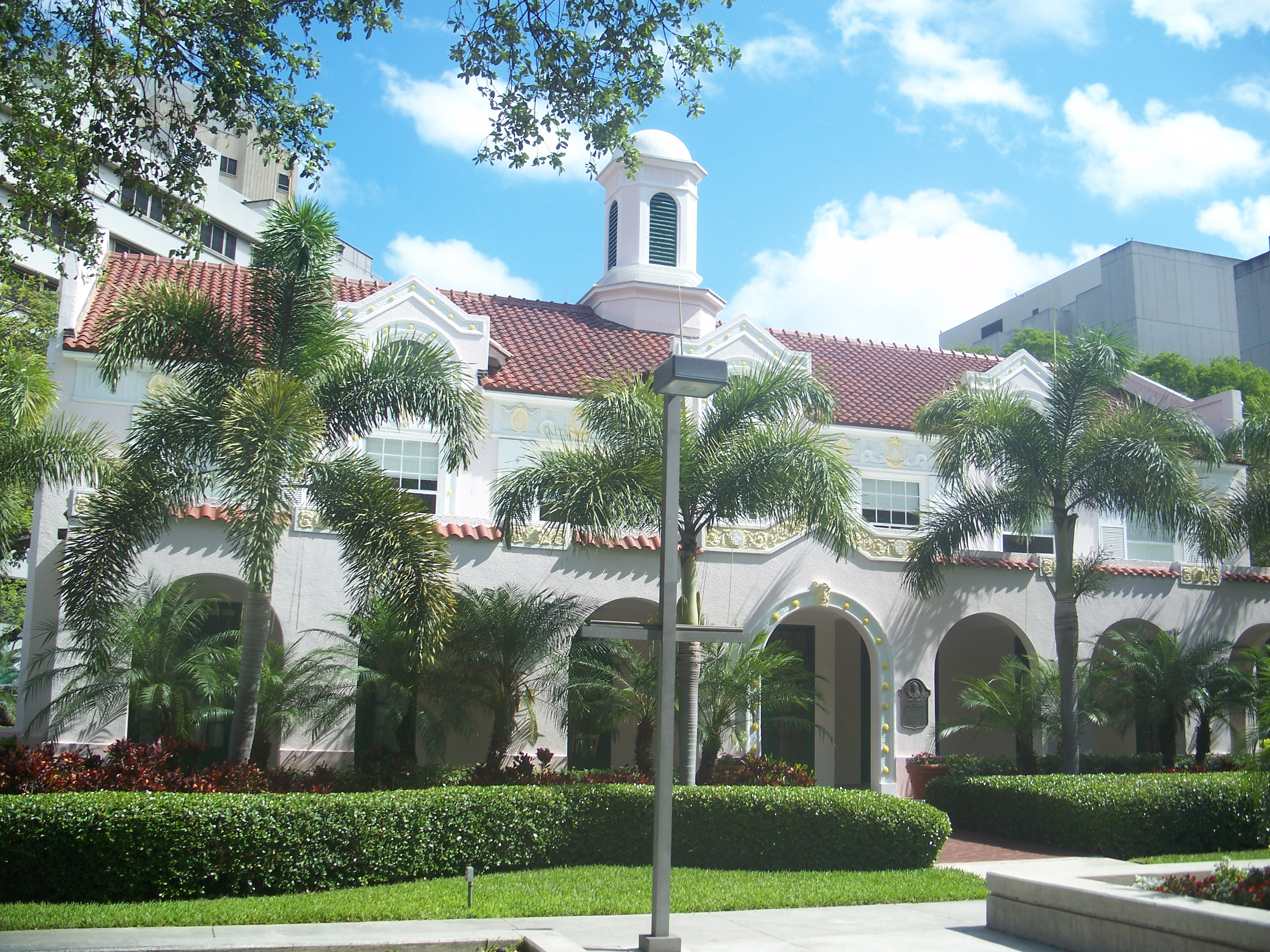
Miami City Hospital, Building No. 1, 1900-1924
