= José Carbajal =

Jose Carbajal may refer to:

- José Carbajal (Uruguayan musician) (1943–2010)
- José María Jesús Carbajal (1809–1874) Mexican freedom fighter
- El Taiger (1987–2024) Cuban reaggaeton singer, born José Manuel Carbajal Zaldivar
