= Maria Abreu =

Maria Abreu may refer to:

- Maria T. Abreu (born 1966), American gastroenterologist
- Maria João Abreu (1964–2021), Portuguese film, television and stage actress
