= Ernest Y. C. Lee =

Biochemist

Ernest Yee Chung Lee is a biochemist.

Lee earned a bachelor's degree with honors at the University of Cape Town and a doctorate in organic chemistry at the University of London Royal Free Hospital School of Medicine. He completed postdoctoral research at the University of Washington and the University of Miami School of Medicine, where he later joined the faculty.

Lee moved to the New York Medical College in 1997, and was appointed the first NYMC Alumni Chair in Biochemistry and Molecular Biology in 2008, holding the endowed professorship until his retirement in December 2021.
