= Disposable Film Festival =

- Current: 10th Season
- Country: International
- First award: January 2008
- Website: disposablefilmfest.com

The Disposable Film Festival (DFF) is an annual juried international festival of short films made using casual, lo-fi video capture devices like cell phones, point and shoot cameras, webcams, and inexpensive handycams. It also features artist profile screenings of filmmakers working in these media and hosts educational film workshops.

Through screenings, workshops, competitions, panels, and other events intended to educate and inspire, the Disposable Film Festival promotes experimentation and helps build the track record needed for a new generation of filmmakers to enter and change the industry. Disposable kicks off in San Francisco every March before traveling to cities around the world.

== History ==
The Disposable Film Festival was founded in San Francisco in 2007 by Carlton Evans and Eric Slatkin, who became the co-directors of the festival. As a result of the Disposable Film Festival, the terms "disposable film", "disposable video", and "disposable filmmaking" have come to refer to the practice of making video in a do-it-yourself aesthetic that is less reliant on formal filmmaking training and more on experimentation with easily available technology.

Through screenings, workshops, competitions, panels, and other events intended to educate and inspire, the Disposable Film Festival promotes experimentation and helps build the track record needed for a new generation of filmmakers to enter and change the industry. Disposable kicks off in San Francisco every March before traveling to cities around the world.

In addition to screenings and exhibition programming, the DFF team works year round to extend the educational experiences of accessible storytelling and production with a diverse community through the Disposable Film Projects, including Film Access Educational Programs and Social Action Film Projects.

The first DFF event was held at Artists' Television Access on January 19, 2008. The program then went on to play at venues across world, including screenings in conjunction with the Portable Film Festival based in Melbourne, Australia, at South by Southwest in Austin, Texas, the New Media Meeting in Norrköping, Sweden, and at Jonas Mekas's Anthology Film Archives in New York.

=== Festival Chronology ===
	Event
2008	•The First Annual Disposable Film Festival took place on January 19, 2008 at the Artists' Television Access •Partnered with Dave Eggers's 826 Valencia non-profit, to host a workshop teaching teenagers how to make films using inexpensive video capture devices. A screening of films completed by workshop participants was held on November 16, 2008 at the studios of KQED-TV •Collaborated with Spike Lee on the Nokia Productions project to crowd-source video clips in order to make a three-act feature-length film on the themes of life and death •Program screened in conjunction with Portable Film Festival based in Melbourne, Australia •Program screened in conjunction with South by Southwest in Austin, Texas •Program screened in conjunction with New Media Meeting in Norrköping, Sweden •Program screened in conjunction with Jonas Mekas's Anthology Film Archives in New York
2009	•The second annual Disposable Film Festival ran from January 29 through February 1, 2009 at the Roxie Theater Subsequent nights featured artist profiles showcasing the work of New York film collective Red Bucket Films' feature BUTTONS, VOL. 1 and short works by Fritz Donnelly. The DFF also held a filmmaking panel at Oddball Films •Program screened in conjunction Exploding Cinema in London, England •Program screened in Paris, France •Program screened in Brussels •Program screened in New York, NY •Program screened in Beijing, China •Outdoor Bike-In screenings in conjunction with Good Hotel, Zipcar, San Francisco Bicycle Coalition, and MobMov. This was San Francisco's first ever bike-in screening •Program screened at New York's Anthology Film Archives with selected short works by Fritz Donnelly, and premiered BUTTONS, VOL. 2 by New York filmmakers Red Bucket Films
2010	•The third annual Disposable Film Festival ran from March 4–7, 2010 in San Francisco. Featured filmmakers included Red Bucket Films, Ben Slotover, and Alex Itin. The last day of the festival featured a filmmaking workshop held by Vimeo community director Blake Whitman •Second Annual Outdoor Bike-In in San Francisco's SOMA district, in honor of San Francisco Bike Week and was sponsored by Globe Bikes, Crumpler Bags, Alite Designs, and Good Hotel. Additional partnership with forages which held an Underground Market alongside the event •Slatkin stepped down as co-director of the festival and Katie Gillum became associate director •Special Bastille Day screening featuring many French language film's at San Francisco's Hotel Rex •Signed a major partnership with Globe Bikes. Globe Bikes agreed to help the festival reach out to bicyclists through Bike-In screenings and bike valet in ten cities around the world. In the summer of 2010, The Disposable Film Festival held events in partnership with Globe Bikes in Pittsburgh, PA, London, UK, Los Angeles, CA, and Portland, OR •The Disposable Film Festival in Montreal •The Disposable Film Sidebar at Vimeo Film Festival •The Disposable Film Festival in Lowell, Massachusetts •The Disposable Film Festival in Poro Alegre, Brazil •Held a screening in Beijing, China in partnership with Chinese art and film organization Electric Shadows at the Penghao Theater •Screened for one week at The Greenhouse in New Delhi, India, an organization supported by the Goethe Institute •The Disposable Film Festival in Skopje, Macedonia
2011	•Fourth Annual Disposable Film Festival in March at the Castro Theater •Film Festival Event: How to Become A Disposable DePalma: An Industry Panel and Schmoozewich •Film Festival Event: Hair and Diamonds: A Filmmaker Spotlight •Film Festival Event: Pomplamoose: Workshop and Concert •Film Festival Event: Lights. Camera. Social Action •Film Festival Event: Turn Your Camera On: A Filmmaking Workshop •The Disposable Film Festival Bike-In Screening in San Francisco •The Disposable Film Festival Bike-In Screening in Davis, CA •The Disposable Film Festival's First Annual Health Create-a-thon in conjunction with Practice Fusion •The Disposable Film Festival at North By Northeast Festival in Toronto •The Disposable Film Festival in London, England •Festival Fundraiser Screening in San Francisco •Disposable Film Festival Screening at the Cambridge Film Festival in Cambridge, UK •Disposable Film Festival's Health Create-A-Thon in San Francisco •Disposable Film Festival in Palo Alto, CA •Disposable Film Festival in Philadelphia, PA
2012	•Disposable Film Festival at the Fort Lauderdale Film Festival in St. Augustine, FL •Best of the Disposable Film Festival at Slamdance in Park City, UT •Program Screened in Toronto, Ontario, Canada in conjunction with North by Northeast Festivals and Conference (NXNE) •Disposable Film Festival's Second Annual Health Create-a-thon event in conjunction with Practice Fusion •Hosted the NightLife at the California Academy of Sciences on July 12 •Program screened in conjunction with Exploding Cinema at the Cinema Museum in London, England •Program screened in conjunction with Solar One in Stuyvesant Cove Park in New York City

== Honors ==
The Disposable Film Festival was named one of the world's 25 coolest film festivals in the Summer 2009 issue of MovieMaker Magazine.

== See also ==
Juried (competition)

== External resources ==
- Disposable Film Festival official site
- New York Times article about The Disposable Film Festival, November 4, 2008
- San Francisco Chronicle article about The Disposable Film Festival, August 9, 2008
- "The Disposable Film Festival". Underwire. Wired. March 3, 2010. Archived from the original on March 5, 2010.
- Twitch article about The Disposable Film Festival, August 4, 2011
- Ted Hope article The Disposable Film Festival, December 30, 2011
- Wall Street Journal article The Disposable Film Festival, March 14, 2012
- Singularity Hub article The Disposable Film Festival, March 23, 2012
- Smart Movie Making Blog The Disposable Film Festival, May 8, 2012
- The Guardian UK article The Disposable Film Festival, May 17, 2012
- The Toronto Star article The Disposable Film Festival, June 7, 2012
