= Glenn Laffel =

Glenn Laffel (born February 19, 1954) is a physician and health IT entrepreneur. He formerly served as the senior vice president of clinical affairs for Practice Fusion, a San Francisco-based company that offers a Web-based Electronic Health Record (EHR) for free to physicians.

Laffel had previously served as an attending physician in the cardiac transplantation program at Brigham and Women’s Hospital, as a founding editor of the peer-reviewed journal, Quality Management in Health Care, a consultant to healthcare provider organizations and president of Clinical Solutions.

== Career ==
From 1987 to 1992, Laffel was an attending physician in the heart transplantation program at Brigham and Women’s Hospital, a teaching affiliate of Harvard Medical School . The program was the first of its kind in New England. He was part of a team that first reported a link between Cyclosporine A, prednisone and osteoporosis in heart transplant recipients, and published an article on the relationship between experience and outcomes in heart transplantation.

Laffel also served as the director of quality management at Brigham and Women’s Hospital. He helped establish an early total quality management program in health care and, along with David Blumenthal, the current National Coordinator for Health Information Technology inside HHS, published one of the first articles to appear in a peer-reviewed journal on the health care applications of TQM. He has coauthored papers with Eugene Braunwald, the chairman of the Department of Medicine at Harvard Medical School, Harvey Fineberg, the dean of the Harvard School of Public Health (and current president of the Institute of Medicine), and Donald Berwick, the president of the Institute for Healthcare Improvement (and currently President Obama’s nominee to serve as administrator for the Centers for Medicare and Medicaid Services).

Starting in March 1988, Laffel co-developed and taught the course, Improving Health Care Quality for the Institute for Healthcare Improvement. The team of developers included Donald Berwick, Paul Plsek and David Gustafson. Laffel founded the peer-reviewed journal, Quality Management in Health Care during this time.

In 1997, Laffel and two partners, Harry Harrington and Dennis McShane, MD, founded Clinical Solutions, a Menlo Park-based company for which Laffel served as president. Clinical Solutions created and licensed algorithmic content for use in nurse triage call centers.

By 2003, Clinical Solutions' triage algorithms had become widely used around the world and provided advice to more than 40 million callers. Deployments of Clinical Solutions' content included NHS Direct, a toll-free national service provided to British citizens by the British National Health Service, Queensland Health (Australia), and the New South Wales Ambulance Service (Australia).

In conjunction with Priority Dispatch Corporation, Clinical Solutions also created a fully integrated 911-nurse triage product. The integrated product is being used by ambulance dispatch organizations in several countries.

Clinical Solutions was acquired by its primary licensor, CAS Services (UK) in 2006.

Laffel joined Practice Fusion in December 2008 as the senior vice president for clinical affairs. Practice Fusion offers a Web-based Electronic Health Record (EHR) for free to providers. Laffel oversaw business development and regulatory affairs for the San Francisco-based company.

== Education ==
PhD in health policy and management from MIT and the MIT Sloan School of Management, 1991. The subject of his dissertation was the relationship between experience and outcome in heart transplantation. A condensed version of his dissertation was published in The New England Journal of Medicine.

The University of Miami Leonard M. Miller School of Medicine, 1976 - 1980.

Tufts University, 1972 - 1976. Undergraduate degree in Biology and Psychology.

== Training ==
Laffel completed a three-year medical residency in Internal Medicine and a three-year fellowship in Cardiovascular Disease at Brigham and Women’s Hospital, an academic medical center and a major teaching affiliate of Harvard Medical School.
