= Langbehn =

Langbehn is a surname. Notable people with this surname include:

- Carl Langbehn (1901–1944), German lawyer and member of the resistance to Nazism
- Julius Langbehn (1851–1907), German national Romantic art historian and philosopher
- Janice Langbehn (born 1968), American LGBTI activist
