= ISOFT =

iSOFT
- Industry: Healthcare IT
- Headquarters: Sydney, Australia
- Products: Healthcare Software Applications
- Website: www.dxc.technology/healthcare

iSOFT is an international supplier of software applications for the healthcare sector. Its products are used by an estimated 13,000 organisations in 40 countries for managing patient information and healthcare services. It was acquired by DXC Technology in 2011.

== History ==
iSOFT was founded in 1996 as a business group within accounting group, KPMG, and bought out of the Group in May 1999. It was then floated in July 2000.

In October 2006 iSOFT put itself up for sale. and on 16 May 2007, iSOFT announced its recommendation to accept a merger with Australian company IBA Health in an all-stock deal.

Its headquarters was in Sydney, Australia prior to its acquisition by DXC Technology in 2011.

== Accountancy irregularities ==
In the summer of 2004 the Guardian newspaper saw a confidential report suggesting questionable accounting practices in iSOFT tracing back to 2002. iSOFT sought and obtained an injunction against the paper preventing publication of the story, and a Parliamentary Written Question was answered by the government saying that they had no plans to look into the matter.

The leaked confidential report had been commissioned prior to a merger between itself and its rival Torex and had raised sufficient concerns within Torex that it was only rescued by the personal assurance of Sir Digby Jones, then Director-General of the CBI and non-executive director of iSOFT.

Following profits warnings in January 2006 and June 2006 due to changes in its accounting policy, the resignation of its chief executive, the announcement of losses of £344m for the year to April 2006, extensive delays to its already overdue Lorenzo product and the pulling out of one of its two main customers, Accenture, from the NHS government contract in September, and the opening of an investigation by the Financial Services Authority, the gagging order against the newspaper was lifted in October.

In January 2010, the FSA confirmed that they had begun legal proceedings against the four directors who were involved in the irregularities. In March, the AADB excluded Ian Storey, former financial controller, from membership of his professional body ICAEW. They were acquitted at Southwark Crown Court on 22 July after a seven-year investigation and two trials brought by the Financial Conduct Authority, which said it would not pursue a third prosecution as the “case was now stale”. In 2013 the FCA has closed the case because of "procedural problems", clearing Patrick Cryne, Stephen Graham, Timothy Whiston and John Whelan of wrongdoing.

In 2011, the Accountancy and Actuarial Discipline Board fined Robson Rhodes £225,000 and ordered it to pay a contribution of £750,000 towards its costs. It also reprimanded Glyn Williams, a partner in the firm, and fined him £15,000.

== Software problems ==
iSOFT's flagship product Lorenzo patient record systems was dogged by a number of issues mainly centred on delays to delivery schedules and questions over its suitability for the purpose it was intended. As a result of continuous delays and quality issues, SingHealth, one of iSOFT's three early adopters, abandoned plans to wait for delivery of Lorenzo and opted to return to i. Clinical Manager's heritage product and deployed Sunrise Clinical Manager from Eclipsys instead.

== See also ==
- Digitisation
- Information technology
- National Programme for IT
