= Thomas J. Balkany =

American ear surgeon (1948–2025)

- Born: May 1, 1948; Coral Gables, Florida, U.S.
- Died: July 29, 2025 (aged 77)
- Education: University of Miami
- Spouse: Diane Balkany
- Medical career
- Field: Otolaryngology; Neurotology
- Institutions: Miller School of Medicine (University of Miami)
- Research: Cochlear implantation

Thomas Jay Balkany (May 1, 1948 – July 29, 2025) was an American ear surgeon, otolaryngologist and neurotologist specializing in cochlear implantation.

Balkany was the Hotchkiss Endowment Distinguished Professor and Chairman Emeritus in the Department of Otolaryngology and Professor of Neurological Surgery and Pediatrics at the University of Miami's Miller School of Medicine. Additionally, he was a fellow of the American Academy of Otolaryngology–Head and Neck Surgery, the American College of Surgeons and the American Academy of Pediatrics.

== Early life and education ==
Balkany was born and raised in Coral Gables, Florida, and decided to be a physician at the age of 12. He graduated from the University of Miami Miller School of Medicine in 1972.

His postgraduate training included surgical residency at St. Joseph Hospital in Denver, and his otolaryngology residency at the University of Colorado School of Medicine. Balkany also completed additional neurotology and cochlear implantation training under William House at the House Ear Institute in Los Angeles.

== Career ==
In 1990, Balkany returned to the University of Miami as founding director of the Ear Institute and cochlear implant program. He established the department's Microsurgery Training Laboratory in 1995 to provide training for surgeries that restore hearing, remove tumors from the skull base, repair facial nerves, correct balance disorders and treat chronic ear infections. Balkany succeeded W. Jarrard Goodwin as chairman of the Department of Otolaryngology in 2000.

In 2007, Balkany was elected vice president of the American Otologic, Rhinologic and Laryngologic Society.) During his 25 years at the University of Miami, Balkany helped restore hearing to more than 2,000 deaf children and adults from South Florida, Latin America, Europe, Asia, the Middle East and other regions, including a three-year-old Iraqi child who was born deaf and transported from a battle zone to Miami by the U.S. Military. In 2009, he stepped down as chairman and became director of the University of Miami Ear Institute. He also served as Senior Examiner of the American Board of Otolaryngology and the American Board of Neurotology and a member of the Boards of Directors of the American Academy of Otolaryngology–Head and Neck Surgery, Auditory-Verbal International, AG Bell, Florida and as President of the Florida Society of Otolaryngology–Head and Neck Surgery. Dr. Balkany was the founding chairman of the William House Cochlear Implant Study Group and founding board member of the American Cochlear Implant Alliance (ACIA).

Balkany held 14 U.S. and international patents on cochlear implant technologies. Additionally, he wrote three books and more than 300 scientific publications on the topic of ear surgery. Balkany founded the Institute for Cochlear Implant Training, ICIT, a Florida nonprofit corporation, in 2012. ICIT provides 3 month-long advanced training courses for surgeons, audiologists, language specialists ant others with a goal of improving patient outcomes.

== Death ==
Balkany died on July 29, 2025, at the age of 77, after a long struggle with cancer.

== Recognition ==
Balkany was honored by the Prime Minister of the State of Israel for performing the first cochlear implants and helping to start the first two cochlear implant centers in that country. He received the New York League for the Hard of Hearing's Fowler Award for his work in the ethics of cochlear implantation of young children. He also received the Hallpike-Nylen prize for clinical research from the Bárány Society in Uppsala, Sweden. Balkany received the Graham Frasier Award of the British Cochlear Implant Group at the Royal Society of Medicine in 2004 for his work in cochlear implantation. He was also recognized with the Lifetime Achievement Award from the Greater Miami Chamber of Commerce at the Health Care Heroes Awards Luncheon in 2012.

== Bibliography ==
- The Ear Book Thomas Balkany and Kevin Brown. Johns Hopkins Press, 2017.
- The Cochlear Implant, Thomas Balkany (Ed.). Elsevier (1986)
- Clinical Pediatric Otolaryngology. Thomas Balkany, Nigel Pashley. Mosby (1986).
- Cochlear Implant Surgeons Training Course MOOC, Balkany TJ, Roland P, Luxford W, Zwollan TA, Buchman CA (Institute for Cochlear Implant Training) 2014.
- Otoacoustic Emissions, Balkany TJ, Lonsbury-Martin BL. Am J Otol (Monograph) Supplement 15:1 1994;1-38.
