= Anita Marks =

American football player and reporter (born 1970)

Anita Susanne Marks (born April 29, 1970) is a radio personality, football sideline reporter, and former women's professional football player.

== Personal life ==
Anita grew up in south Dade County, Florida. Marks graduated from Miami Sunset Senior High School in 1988.

== Playing career ==
She then attended the University of South Florida, where she competed in Collegiate Flag Football for four years. Anita graduated with a Communications degree in 1992.

Marks played women's professional football from 2000 to 2004, playing the majority of that time for the Miami Fury and played in the WPFL championship her final season with the Florida Stingrays.

Marks posed for Playboy in 2002, during her career as a professional football player.

== Broadcast career ==
Anita is a former host of sports talk radio on 105.7 The Fan in Baltimore. She co-hosted a show which was also simulcast on MASN-TV. She hosted her own Fantasy Football Show on MASN called "Fantasy Blitz," and was a sideline reporter for the United Football League which aired on Versus. Marks left CBS Radio Baltimore on January 25, 2010, to pursue other opportunities.

Anita worked on the New York Giants broadcast team: hosting shows on the MSG Network, WWOR-TV My9, and Verizon Fios, as well as the pre- & postgame on WFAN Sports Radio in New York. She also hosted shows on SiriusXM and NBC Sports Radio and was a fantasy football analyst for Bloomberg Sports. She is now an update anchor and fill-in talk show host for ESPN New York. She hosts a show called "Sunday Funday" every Sunday from 9am-1pm.
