= Veradigm =

American company

Veradigm Inc.
- Type: Public
- Traded as: Expert Market: MDRX
- Industry: Information Technology
- Founded: 1982 (as Medic Computer Systems); 1986 (as Allscripts)
- Headquarters: Chicago, Illinois, U.S.
- Key people: Rick Poulton (CEO, 2022-2023); Paul M. Black (CEO, 2012-2022)
- Products: Analytics and Insights Care Coordination; Financial; Clinical Patient Engagement
- Revenue: ▼US$1.50 billion (FY 2020)
- Net income: ▲US$700.4 million (FY 2020)
- Total assets: ▼US$2.917 billion (FY 2020)
- Total equity: ▲US$1.666 billion (FY 2020)
- Number of employees: 8400 (2016)
- Website: veradigm.com

Veradigm Inc. (formerly Allscripts Healthcare Solutions, Inc.) is a publicly traded American company that provides physician practices, hospitals, and other healthcare providers with practice management and electronic health record (EHR) technology. Veradigm also provides products for patient engagement and care coordination, as well as financial and analytics technology. The company has more than 180,000 physician users and has products in 2,700 hospitals and 13,000 extended care organizations. The company formally changed its name from Allscripts to Veradigm in January 2023.

== History ==
Allscripts was founded in 1981 and is headquartered in Chicago, Illinois. An additional key operations' office is located in Raleigh, North Carolina.

In 2008, Allscripts merged with the healthcare systems operations of its rival, Misys. In 2010, Allscripts-Misys merged with another healthcare information technology competitor, Eclipsys, in a $1.3 billion deal, merging patient records, to create the industry's largest network of clients.

In 2015, Allscripts acquired the California medical billing company CHMB Inc. 2017, Allscripts acquired the patient-engagement assets of NantHealth.

Allscripts acquired McKesson's healthcare IT business on August 3, 2017., which included McKesson properties such as Per-Se Technologies, Enterprise Solutions, and HBO & Company.

In 2020 Allscripts executed two major divestment moves. In October, Allscripts sold its EPSi business, a provider of financial decision support and planning tools for hospitals and health systems, to Strata Decision Technology for $365 million. Later, in December 2020, Allscripts closed the sale of its care coordination business, CarePort Health, to Wellsky for $1.35 billion.

On January 3, 2023, Allscripts announced a corporate name change to Veradigm.

On February 29, 2024 Veradigm was suspended from the Nasdaq Stock Market due to non-compliance with listing rules. The company had failed to file its Annual Report for the year ended December 31, 2022 or its Quarterly Reports on for the quarters ended March 31, 2023, June 30, 2023 and September 30, 2023. The Company was also noncompliant with Nasdaq Listing Rules requiring companies listing common stock to hold an annual meeting of stockholders no later than one year after the end of the company’s fiscal year.

== Acquisitions ==
In March 2013, Allscripts acquired dbMotion, Ltd., a developer of system interfaces and data analytics tools, and Jardogs LLC, a developer of a personal health record.

In July 2014, Allscripts acquired the London-based Oasis Medical Solutions to incorporate its leading Patient Administration System into its Allscripts Sunrise clinical system to make a single Electronic Patient Record solution.

In 2018 Allscripts acquired Practice Fusion.

In 2019, Allscripts acquired ZappRx, a Boston-based prescription drug startup, which provides an online platform used by patients, physicians, and pharmacists for the management of specialty medications.

== Legal issues ==
In December 2012, four physician practices brought a class-action suit against Allscripts due to selling the "buggy" MyWay EHR and later discontinuing it. It was believed to be a first-of-its-kind case. The parties reached a joint settlement agreement that received final approval from the trial court judge. With this first lawsuit of this nature it has become a reference for future cases in this industry.

In 2015 Allscripts was set to pay nearly $9.75 million to the proposed class to settle claims of securities fraud, after the company allegedly overstated its ability to integrate its Microsoft .NET and SQL Server with those of Eclipsys following their $1.3 billion merger.

In 2019, one year after Allscripts’ acquisition of Practice Fusion, a San Francisco-based electronic health records company, the acquisition of which was intended to expand Allscripts' business with independent physicians, Allscripts agreed to settle with the Department of Justice over "potential issues with the EHR vendor’s health IT certification and Practice Fusion’s compliance with the Anti-Kickback Statute and HIPAA." As part of the settlement, Practice Fusion paid $145 million.

In 2020, the Department of Justice detailed the $145 million settlement in a press release:

Practice Fusion’s conduct is abhorrent. During the height of the opioid crisis, the company took a million-dollar kickback to allow an opioid company to inject itself in the sacred doctor-patient relationship so that it could peddle even more of its highly addictive and dangerous opioids.

— Christina E. Nolan, U.S. Attorney for the District of Vermont

Allscripts' General Counsel and Chief Administrative Officer Brian Farley said that Allscripts had further strengthened Practice Fusion's compliance program since learning of the matter. Farley also noted that Allscripts was working to help combat the opioid epidemic.

== Ransomware attack ==
On January 18, 2018, Allscripts was hit with a ransomware attack. This caused a massive outage which lasted nearly a week and affected. The attack was a new strain of a known bug, SamSam. Since then, clients have filed a class action lawsuit alleging Allscripts should have taken better steps to protect their data.
