= MediNotes =

MediNotes Corporation
- Company type: Private
- Industry: Electronic medical records, computer software, publishing
- Founded: 1995 in Des Moines, Iowa
- Headquarters: West Des Moines, Iowa, United States
- Key people: Donald Schoen, Co-founder, President, CEO
- Products: MediNotes e ChiroChart; MediNotes Clinician

The MediNotes Corporation was a private, independent software vendor (ISV) based in West Des Moines, Iowa. They manufactured and published, maintained, and supported an Electronic Medical Records solution called MediNotes e. MediNotes was featured in Inc. Magazine as part of the Inc. 500 list in 2005 and 2006, and as part of the Inc. 5000 list in 2007.

== History ==
Founded by Scott Leum, a podiatric physician, and Donald Schoen in February 1996, MediNotes originally developed and sold a package called PodNotes, a product marketed primarily at the Podiatry discipline. Eventually the product spread to other disciplines and the name was changed to Charting Plus. Leum would leave MediNotes in 2000 to pursue other interests. A few years later, about 2007, Charting Plus was renamed MediNotes e. Don Schoen previously owned and operated another software firm prior to MediNotes called Retail Management Systems.

MediNotes gained some notoriety following Hurricane Katrina in 2005. Mobile, Alabama, podiatrist Dr. William Rogers was cited in the press as having used Charting Plus in his practice. Dr. Rogers had his entire electronic system backed up onto tapes, safeguarding the patient records, something he noted would have been difficult with paper.

In first quarter 2008, MediNotes acquired Bond Technologies, a corporation based in Tampa, Florida, renaming their EMR solution to MediNotes Clinician. This would be short-lived as later in 2008, Atlanta, GA, based Eclipsys acquired MediNotes for $45 million. MediNotes Clinician was renamed PeakPractice. Allscripts then acquired Eclipsys and announced the sunsetting of PeakPractice (formerly Bond Clinician) and Medinotes effective January 1, 2013 and replaced all previous MediNotes software offerings with Allscripts products.

== See also ==
- Electronic medical records
