= Miami City Hospital, Building No. 1 =

- U.S. National Register of Historic Places
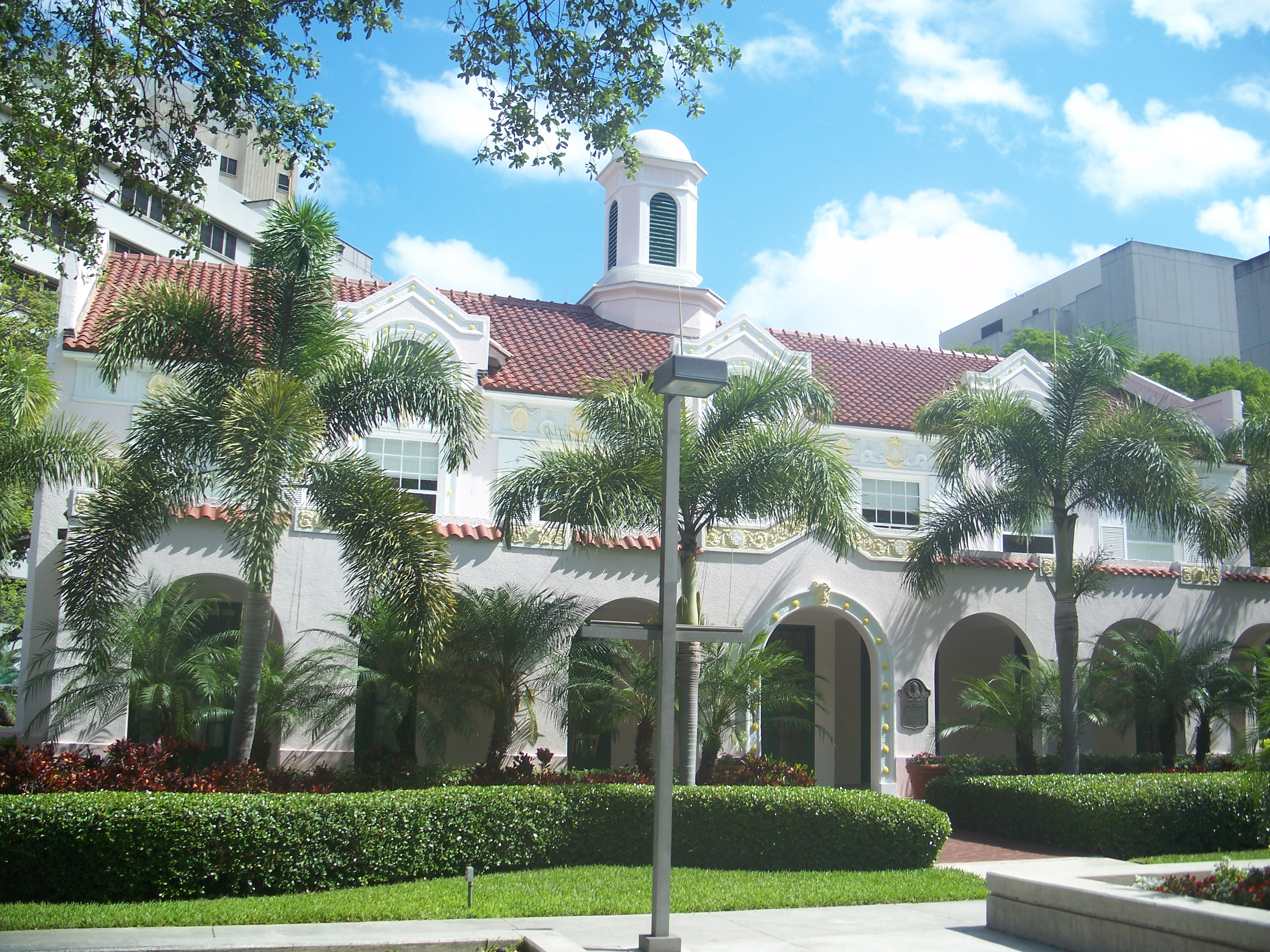
- Miami City Hospital, Building No. 1, April 2011

- Location within Miami Location within Florida Location within the United States
- Location: Miami, Florida, U.S.
- Coordinates: 25°47′29″N 80°12′45″W
- NRHP reference No.: 79000666
- Added to NRHP: December 31, 1979

The Miami City Hospital, Building No. 1 is a historic hospital in Miami, Florida. The historic hospital, which is also known as The Alamo, is located at 1119 Northwest 16th Avenue. On December 31, 1979, the building was added to the U.S. National Register of Historic Places. It is known today as Jackson Memorial Hospital.
