= Miami Sunset Senior High School =

Secondary school in Kendale Lakes, Florida

Coordinates: 25.701547°N 80.405315°W

Location
- 13125 SW 72nd St; Miami, Florida 33183; United States

Information
- Type: Public, Secondary
- Motto: Stay Golden Sunset!
- Established: September 1978
- Status: Active
- School district: Miami-Dade County Public Schools District 10
- Principal: Rodolfo Rodriguez
- Teaching staff: 52.00 (FTE)
- Grades: 9–12
- Enrollment: 1,065 (2023-2024)
- Student to teacher ratio: 20.48
- Campus: Suburban
- Colors: Black, silver and gold
- Mascot: Krypto the Knight
- Nickname: Knights
- Rival: Southwest Miami Highschool
- School hours: 7:20am-2:20pm
- Average class size: 20.6
- Website: miamisunsetsenior.com

Miami Sunset Senior High School is a secondary school of the Miami-Dade County Public Schools system. The principal is Rodolfo Rodriguez.

It is located in the Kendale Lakes census-designated place in unincorporated Miami-Dade County.

== Demographics ==
In the academic year 2019–2020 there were 1,415 students enrolled. Approximately 89% were ethnically Hispanic, 6% white, 4% black, and 1% of Asian/Pacific origin. Just over half the students (1239) were eligible for free lunch.

== Athletics ==
=== State championships ===
- Soccer
  - Men's: 1989 (4A), 2004 (6A), 2005 (6A)
- Tennis
  - Men's: 2000 (4A), 2001 (4A), 2002 (4A), 2003 (4A)
  - Women's: 1996 (6A), 1997 (6A), 1998 (6A), 1999 (6A), 2000 (4A), 2001 (4A), 2002 (4A), 2003 (4A), 2004 (4A), 2005 (4A)
    (state record for most consecutive championships)
- Volleyball
  - Women's: 1980 (4A), 1985 (4A), 1987 (4A), 1988 (4A), 1993 (5A), 1995 (6A)

== Notable alumni ==
=== Athletics ===
- Fuad Reveiz, class of 1981, former NFL player
- Alan Veingrad, class of 1981, NFL American football player
- Ronni Reis, class of 1984, tennis player
- Anita Marks, class of 1988, ESPN announcer and former football player
- Mark Campbell, class of 1990, NFL football player
- Raúl Ibañez, class of 1990, MLB player
- Cristie Kerr, class of 1996, LPGA Tour professional
- Torrance Marshall, class of 1996, former NFL player
- Eric Vasquez, class of 2001, former MLS player
- Luis Alberto Perea, class of 2004, former MLS player
- Eddy Piñeiro, class of 2014, NFL football player

=== Politics ===
- Esteban Bovo, class of 1980, mayor of Hialeah, Florida
- Michael Bileca, class of 1988, former member of the Florida House of Representatives
- Anthony Rodriguez, class of 2006, member of the Florida House of Representatives

=== Other ===
- Maria T. Abreu, class of 1984, gastroenterologist
- Maud Newton, class of 1993, writer
- Kimberly Peirce, class of 1985, film director
- DJ EFN, class of 1993, record label executive and DJ.
- Frank Rubio, class of 1994, NASA astronaut
- Yvette Prieto, class of 1997, model
- Tony Succar, class of 2004, musician
- Sol Rodriguez, class of 2008, actress

== See also ==
- Miami-Dade County Public Schools
- Education in the United States
