= Juried competition =

Competition in which participants' work is judged by a person or panel of persons

A juried competition is a competition in which participants' work is judged by a person or panel of persons convened specifically to judge the participants' efforts. The jury may be referred to as a competition jury or awards jury, and usually presents awards based on specific criteria for the competition.

== Usage ==
The phrase "juried competition" is usually used to describe creative contests: artistic and literary competitions rather than sports tournaments or academic and scholarship competitions, although such competitions have similarities. Generally, juried competitions are contests that individuals actively enter to compete for prizes, rather than events in which the competitors are passively nominated by others, such as the Academy Awards or the Turner Prize.

The Guggenheim Fellowship is an example of an award which straddles the line between a scholarship contest and a juried art competition. The phrase 'juried competition' is also applied to non-fine-arts contests which yet encompass distinctively creative endeavors: a cook-off is one such contest.

== Description ==
A juried competition judges entries either by the competition's stated rubric, or by a subjective set of criteria, dependent upon the nature of the competition or the judges themselves. For example, in a juried competition where participants compete against each other for a monetary prize, for inclusion in a show or publication, or for representation by a gallery, the work presented is judged by one or more persons, often experts, for such prize, inclusion, or representation.

Juried competitions also include contests in film (often at film festivals), television, new media. Britain's Got Talent and American Idol are both juried competitions, as is the Disposable Film Festival. Most notable film festivals, such as Cannes, Berlin, Venice, Sundance and Toronto, have prizes awarded by a competition jury.

== History ==
In very early juried competitions in Greece, under Aeschylus and his successors, theatrical contests "advanced to a high degree of importance" and were "placed under the superintendence of" (juried by) "the magistracy". The Greek god Agôn personifies solemn contests. During the Middle Ages in 1441, a public poetry competition called the Certame Coronario was held in Florence with the intention of proving that the spoken Italian language was not inferior to Latin.

More recently, but before the advent of the Internet, national and international juried competitions were (and still are) advertised in trade publications, with jurists selected from among the artistic or literary elite. Before digitized images became widely available, competitions of visual works accepted primarily photographic slides from competitors to represent the work entered because of the cost-prohibitive nature of sending and receiving whole artworks. After judging, only the selected works were sent on for public viewing if the competition included such a venue for the selected works. Written works such as poetry and prose, being less bulky, were entered in competitions via post and received in their original format.

Since the advent of the Internet, many competitions for visual works began accepting entries in digital form as well as slide form, while literary competitions began to accept works submitted online as well as by post. The growth of the Internet also saw service firms appear offering organizational tools for juried competitions allowing for such conveniences as online storage and access of digital images. Juried competitions also benefit from the immediacy of the Internet in that competitions listings are aggregated by some sites making such listings more widely accessible than when they were enumerated primarily in trade publications. Some juried competitions in art and literature exist entirely online, or both online and in print.

== See also ==
- Art exhibition
- Competition
