= Mark Campbell (defensive tackle) =

Jamaican gridiron football player (born 1972)

No. 90, 97
- Position: Defensive tackle

Personal information
- Born: September 12, 1972 (age 54); Jamaica
- Listed height: 6 ft 1 in (1.85 m)
- Listed weight: 290 lb (132 kg)

Career information
- High school: Miami Sunset (Miami, Florida, U.S.)
- College: Florida (1991–1995)
- NFL draft: 1996: 3rd round, 78th overall pick

Career history
- Denver Broncos (1996); Arizona Cardinals (1997); Atlanta Falcons (1998)*; Indianapolis Colts (1999)*; Orlando Rage (2001)
- * Offseason or practice squad member only

Awards and highlights
- First-team All-SEC (1995)

Career NFL statistics
- Tackles: 4
- Stats at Pro Football Reference

Mark Anthony Campbell (born September 12, 1972) is an American former professional football player who was a defensive tackle for the Arizona Cardinals of the National Football League (NFL). Campbell played college football for the Florida Gators from 1992 to 1995. He was selected by the Denver Broncos in the third round of the 1996 NFL draft, and played a single season for the Arizona Cardinals in 1997. Campbell was also a member of the Orlando Rage of the XFL.

== Early life and college ==
Mark Anthony Campbell was born on September 12, 1972, in Jamaica. He attended Miami Sunset High School in Miami, Florida. He recorded 82 tackles and 18 sacks his senior year, earning first-team All-District and second-team All-Dade County honors.

== College career ==
Campbell received an athletic scholarship to attend the University of Florida in Gainesville, Florida, where he was a letterman for coach Steve Spurrier's Florida Gators football team from 1992 to 1995. He was redshirted in 1991. He earned Football News honorable mention All-American, and Associated Press and Coaches first-team All-SEC honors his senior year in 1995. He played in 50 games, starting, 40, during his college career, totaling 127 tackles, 17.3 sacks, five forced fumbles, three fumble recoveries, and two pass breakups. Campbell played in the East-West Shrine game after his senior season. He majored in public recreation at Florida.

== Professional career ==
Campbell was selected by the Denver Broncos in the third round, with the 78th overall pick, of the 1996 NFL draft. He officially signed with the team on July 16, 1996. He did not appear in any games during the 1996 season, and was waived by the Broncos on August 14, 1997.

Campbell was claimed off waivers by the Arizona Cardinals on August 15, 1997. He played in five games for the Cardinals in 1997, recording four solo tackles. He was released on February 12, 1998.

Campbell signed with the Atlanta Falcons on April 22, 1998. He was released on August 22, 1998, after being injured.

He was signed by the Indianapolis Colts on April 20, 1999, but was later released on August 23, 1999.

In October 2000, Campbell was a territorial selection of the Orlando Rage in the XFL draft. He played in nine games for the Rage during the 2001 XFL season, totaling five solo tackles and two assisted tackles.

== See also ==
- List of Florida Gators in the NFL draft
