= Erin Marcus =

American physician, writer

Erin N. Marcus is an American internal medicine doctor and professor of clinical medicine at the Miller School of Medicine at the University of Miami. She has written on public health and health disparity issues for The Washington Post, The Atlantic, The New York Times, and other publications.

Marcus is a former American Association for the Advancement of Science Mass Media Fellow and worked as a newspaper reporter before receiving her medical degree. I

Much of her non-academic writing focuses on how different public policies affect the diverse patients she sees as a primary care physician in Miami.

== Selected academic publications ==
- Marcus EN, Yepes M, Dietz N (2020). "Perception of Breast Density Information Among Women in Miami, FL: a Qualitative Study". Journal of Cancer Education. doi:10.1007/s13187-020-01778-2.
- Allespach H, Marcus EN, Bosire KM (2018). "Sailing on the '7 Cs': teaching junior doctors how to redirect patients during difficult consultations in primary care". Educ Prim Care. 29: 46–48. doi:10.1080/14739879.2017.1312554. PMID 28395646.
- Allespach H, Marcus EN (2016). "'The Rule of Six 2s': teaching learners simple strategies for structuring an outpatient adult primary care follow-up visit in the 21st century". Postgrad Med J. 92 (1093): 629–630. doi:10.1136/postgradmedj-2016-134175. PMID 27555607..
- Marcus EN, Yepes M (2013). "Not just a radiologic term: The conundrum of explaining breast density to patients". Cleveland Clinic Journal of Medicine. 80 (12): 761–765. doi:10.3949/ccjm.80a.13026. PMID 24307159.
- Marcus E. N. (2006). "The silent epidemic—the health effects of illiteracy". New England Journal of Medicine. 355 (4): 339–341.
- Tamariz Leonardo, Palacio Ana, Robert Mauricio, Marcus Erin N (2013). "Improving the informed consent process for research subjects with low literacy: a systematic review". Journal of General Internal Medicine. 28 (1): 121–126.
- Marcus E. N. (2016). "Muslim Women's Preferences in the Medical Setting: How Might They Contribute to Disparities in Health Outcomes?". Journal of Women's Health. 25 (6): 561–562.

== Honors and awards ==
In 2009, she was awarded the American Cancer Society's Cancer Control Career Development Award for Primary Care Physicians and a grant from the Ford Foundation.

In 2013, she was named one of ten internists that physicians should follow on Twitter by Medical Economics magazine.
