= CHMB Inc. =

California-based medical business service company

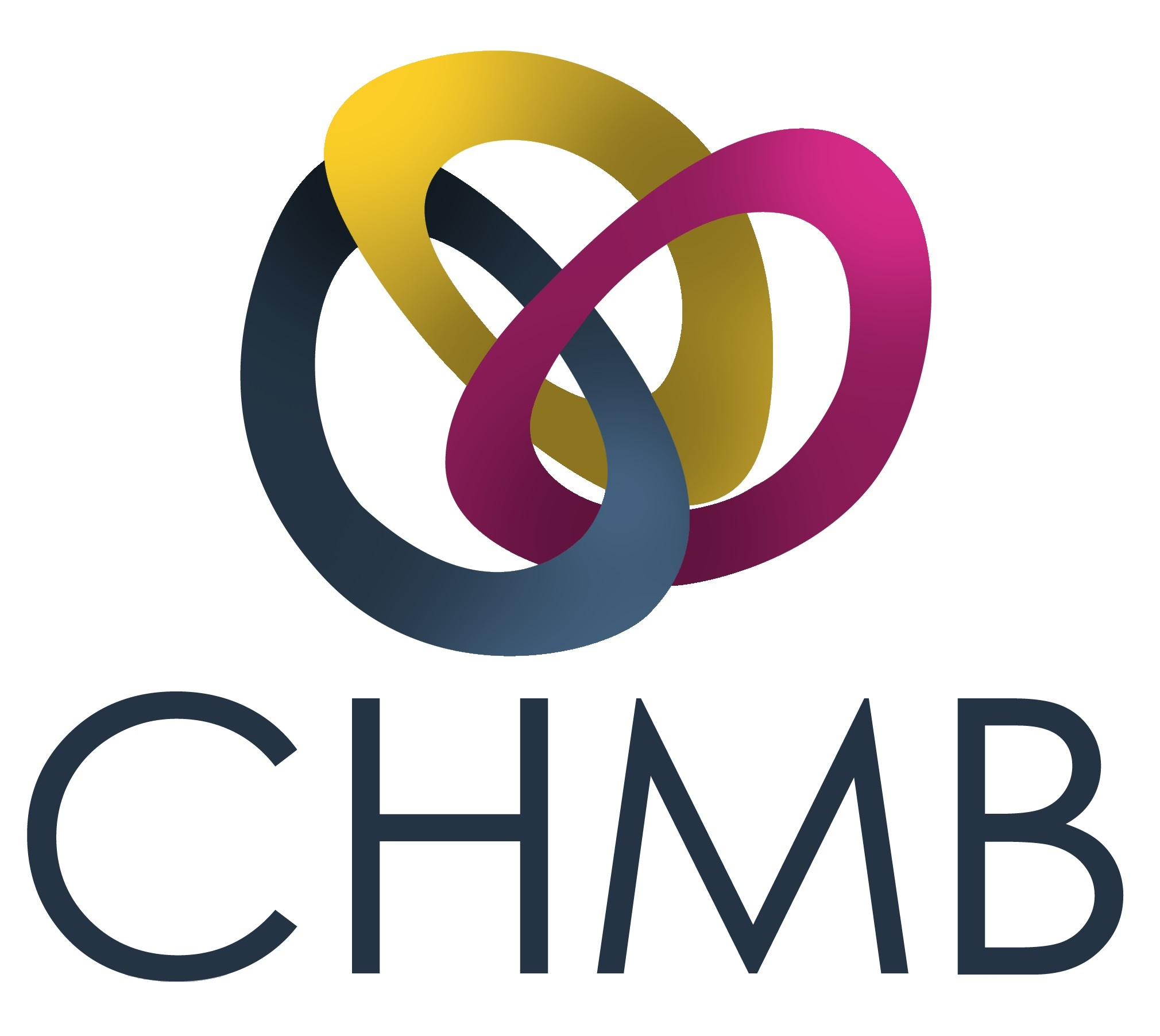
- Industry: Business services
- Founded: 1995
- Founder: Bob Svendsen; Janet Boos
- Headquarters: San Diego, United States
- Key people: CEO Bob Svendsen; President Janet Boos
- Website: chmbinc.com

CHMB Inc. is one of the largest California-based companies that provide business services for doctors and physician practices. It was one of the first businesses of its kind. CHMB is an acronym that means California Healthcare Medical Billing. CHMB Inc. is based in San Diego and was founded in 1995 by CEO Bob Svendsen and President Janet Boos.

The company partnered with Allscripts in 2008 to increase its service offerings. It acquired Davis & Associates Healthcare Solutions in 2011. Additionally, Allscripts ultimately acquired the controlling interest in CHMB in April 2015 for $11.1 million. Currently, CHMB operates on the Allscripts platform and now does service work using the Epic platform.
