= Mary Bartlett Bunge =

American neuroscientist (1931–2024)

- Born: Mary Elizabeth Bartlett; April 3, 1931; New Haven, Connecticut, U.S.
- Died: February 17, 2024 (aged 92); Coral Gables, Florida, U.S.
- Education: Simmons College; University of Wisconsin
- Spouse: Richard Bunge
- Children: Jonathan Bunge, Peter Bunge
- Scientific career
- Fields: Neuroscience
- Workplaces: Washington University in St. Louis; University of Miami

Mary Elizabeth Bartlett Bunge (April 3, 1931 – February 17, 2024) was an American neuroscientist who researched a cure for paralysis at the University of Miami, where she was a professor of cell biology.

== Early life ==
Mary Bartlett was born on April 3, 1931, in New Haven, Connecticut, to George Chapman Bartlett and Margaret Elizabeth (Reynolds) Bartlett. Her father built and renovated houses, including the house in which she grew up, whereas her mother, a descendant of painter Sir Joshua Reynolds, worked as a painter and decorator. Neither of her parents had a college education, and her father thought that a college education was useless for women. Their careers were filled with an artistic expression that Mary found appealing.

After her grandmother taught her how to sew, she expressed herself through art and fashion by designing and making all of her own clothes with the ultimate dream to be a fashion designer in New York City. She strongly considered a career in fashion design, but eventually decided her art interests could just be hobbies. She developed a passion for biology while she was observing the tadpoles swimming around her and questioned how they developed into frogs.

== Education ==
Bartlett attended Simmons College in Boston to become a laboratory technician. At the end of her junior year at Simmons College, Bartlett was inspired to further her education while attending a program at Jackson Memorial Laboratory, where she witnessed a rabbit's heart contract in a tissue culture. This instance triggered the realization that she did not want to be a lab tech; she wanted to do research, so when she graduated from Simmons College in 1953, she accepted the invitation to graduate school at University of Wisconsin Medical School from Dr. Robert Schilling. He was a professor in the Department of Medical Physiology who offered Mary a research assistantship position when she was studying to obtain her master's degree. They researched intrinsic factor, which is lacking from the gastric juices when one has the condition of pernicious anemia and cannot absorb vitamin B12. Their research had a clinical relevance that influenced her later research to be focused toward clinical applications. This work was the basis of her thesis, which allowed her to graduate with her master's degree in medical physiology in 1955.

While studying for her doctorate at the University of Wisconsin Medical School, Mary worked in the zoology department with Dr. Hans Ris. She graduated with her doctorate in 1960.

== Academic career and research ==
Bunge and her husband Richard graduated together from the University of Wisconsin Medical School and moved to Columbia University to begin their post-doctorate research. Bunge worked part-time for eight years as a research associate at Columbia University.

In 1970, Bunge and her family moved to accept faculty positions at Washington University School of Medicine. She chose to be a research assistant professor rather than be on the tenure-track so she could continue raising her sons, who were still young. She also adjusted to a full-time schedule. By 1974, she had started to teach and was promoted to associate professor with tenure. She was promoted again in 1978 to professor.

Richard enriched Bunge's life by introducing her to neuroscience, where she found her purpose and focused her research on while at Washington University School of Medicine. In particular, she focused on researching Schwann cells, which are cells that wrap around the axon of neurons to form the myelin sheath as an insulator to the neuron and to increase the speed impulses are conducted. One of her other major discoveries was that the oligodendrocyte was the cell that made the myelin sheath for the central nervous system. She first discovered this when she examined a section of a kitten's spinal cord in an electron microscope with the oligodendrocyte cell body forming myelin at each end. She also demonstrated that myelin could be reformed in the mature mammalian spinal cord, which has an important clinical relevance in addressing multiple sclerosis and spinal cord injuries, where the myelin has been damaged.

Between 1989 and 2023, Bunge was a leading part of the Miami Project to Cure Paralysis at the University of Miami School of Medicine, where her research on myelin has been implemented. Her husband was invited to be the scientific director of the project, so she was able to work with him there, and when he died in 1996 from esophageal cancer, she took his place at the forefront of the project. The project Bunge took over tests regeneration strategies that could lead to successful treatment of spinal cord injury.

Bunge had the patent in "Schwann Cell Bridge Implants and Phosphodiesterase Inhibitors to Stimulate CNS Nerve Regeneration" from 2009 for the application of restoring function after a central nervous system injury. She has dozens of other patents including "Methods and Systems for Neural Maintenance and Regeneration," "Promoters of Neural Regeneration," and "Phosphodiesterase 4 Inhibitors for Cognitive and Motor Rehabilitation." Her research was used for phase one of clinical trials, which gained approval from the FDA in 2012, to evaluate the safety of transplanting the Schwann cells of recently paralyzed patients into the site of their injury.

While the trial occurred, Bunge worked on other combination treatments for future clinical trials. In 2014, she published in The Journal of Neuroscience the promising results of a strategy tested in rat Schwann cells that were engineered to secrete the growth factor D15A and the enzyme Chondroitinase ABC which alters scar composition. This combination led to more axonal regeneration and functional improvement.

== Honors ==
Bunge was a professor of cell biology, neurological surgery, and neurology at the University of Miami for more than two decades and received recognition for her research. In 1996, she received the Wakeman Award for Spinal Cord Repair. She was a three time recipient of the Javitis Neuroscience Investigator Award from the National Institute of Neurological Disorders and Stroke.

She was the elected Chair of the Development of Women's Careers in Neuroscience Committee through the Society for Neuroscience from 1994 to 2002. In 2000, she received the Mika Salpeter Women In Neuroscience Lifetime Achievement Award for her leadership in advancing the careers of women in neuroscience.

In 2001, she received the Christopher Reeve Research Medal for Spinal Cord Repair. She received the Christine E Lynn Distinguished Professor in Neuroscience Award in 2003 and the Lois Pope LIFE International Research Award in 2005. She was elected to the National Academy of Sciences Institute of Medicine.

== Personal life ==
While at the University of Wisconsin Medical School, she met a medical student named Richard Bunge, whom she married and shared her personal and career lives with. Soon after settling in at Columbia University, they had two sons, Jonathan, born in 1962, and Peter, born in 1964.

Bunge died in Coral Gables, Florida on February 17, 2024, at the age of 92.

== Selected publications ==
- Fouad, Karim; Schnell, Lisa; Bunge, Mary B.; Schwab, Martin E.; Liebscher, Thomas; Pearse, Damien D. (February 2, 2005). "Combining Schwann Cell Bridges and Olfactory-Ensheathing Glia Grafts with Chondroitinase Promotes Locomotor Recovery After Complete Transection of the Spinal Cord". The Journal of Neuroscience. 25 (5): 1169–1178. doi:10.1523/JNEUROSCI.3562-04.2005. ISSN 0270-6474. PMC 6725952. PMID 15689553.
- Emery, Evelyne; Aldana, Philipp; Bunge, Mary Bartlett; Puckett, William; Srinivasan, Anu; Keane, Robert W.; Bethea, John; Levi, Allan D. O. (December 1, 1998). "Apoptosis After Traumatic Human Spinal Cord Injury". Journal of Neurosurgery. 89 (6): 911–920. doi:10.3171/jns.1998.89.6.0911. ISSN 0022-3085. PMID 9833815.
- Bunge, M. B.; Williams, A. K.; Wood, P. M.; Uitto, J.; Jeffrey, J. J. (January 1, 1980). "Comparison of Nerve Cell and Nerve Cell Plus Schwann Cell Cultures, with a Particular Emphasis on Basal Lamina and Collagen Formation". The Journal of Cell Biology. 84 (1): 184–202. doi:10.1083/jcb.84.1.184. ISSN 0021-9525. PMC 2110534. PMID 7188611.
- Bunge, M. B. (August 1, 2001). "Bridging Areas of Injury in the Spinal Cord". The Neuroscientist. 7 (4): 325–339. doi:10.1177/107385840100700409. ISSN 1073-8584. PMID 11488398. S2CID 73020554.
