= Alan Veingrad =

American football player (born 1963)

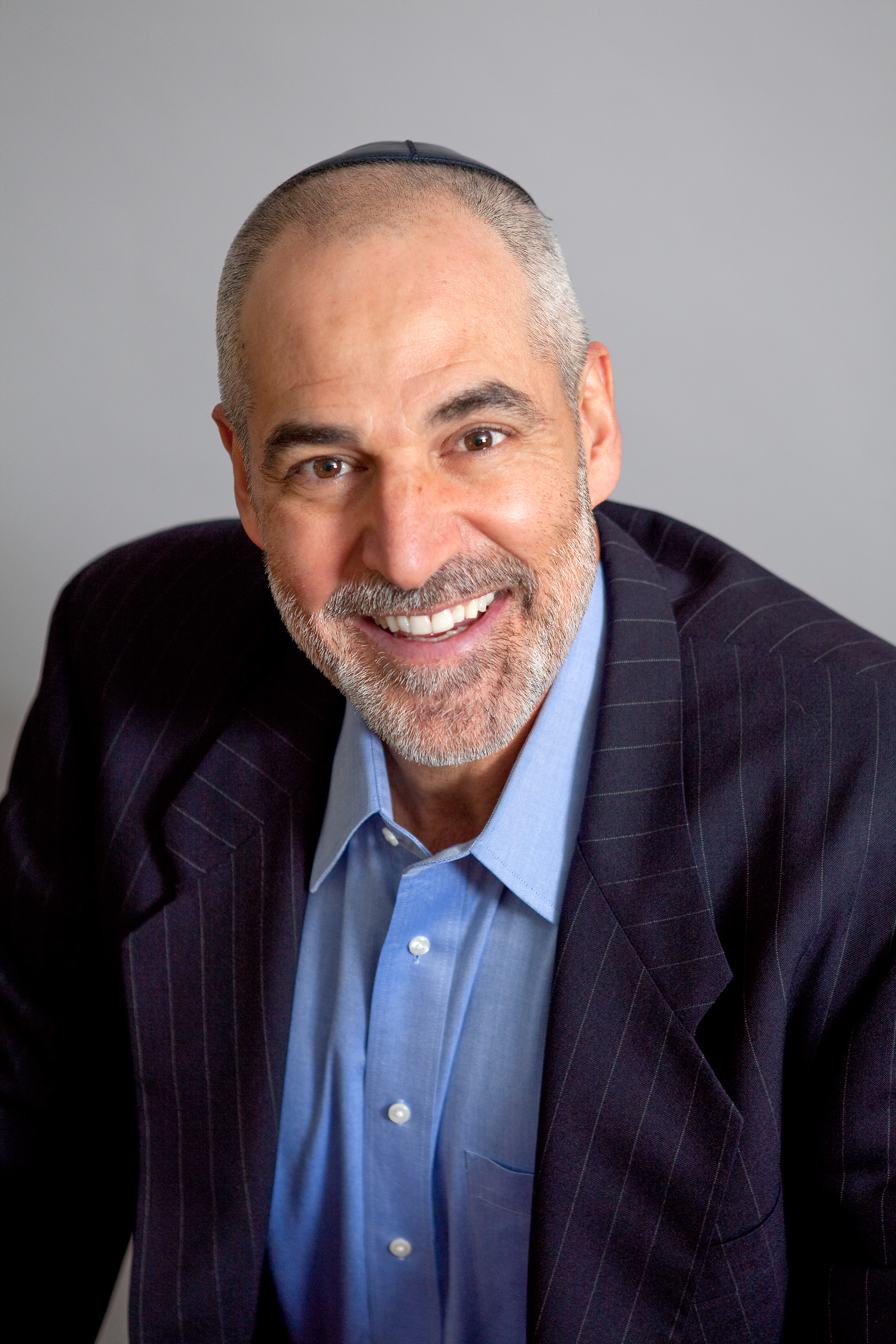

No. 73, 76
- Positions: Tackle, guard

Personal information
- Born: July 24, 1963 (age 63); Brooklyn, New York, U.S.
- Listed height: 6 ft 5 in (1.96 m)
- Listed weight: 277 lb (126 kg)

Career information
- High school: Miami Sunset (Miami, Florida)
- College: East Texas State
- NFL draft: 1985: undrafted

Career history
- Tampa Bay Buccaneers (1985)*; Houston Oilers (1985)*; Green Bay Packers (1986–1990); Dallas Cowboys (1991–1992)
- * Offseason or practice squad member only

Awards and highlights
- Super Bowl champion (XXVII); First-team Eastman Kodak Coaches' College Division II All-American (1984); Lone Star All-Conference first-team (1984); Lone Star Conference Offensive Lineman of the Year (1984); National Strength and Conditioning All-American (1984)

Career NFL statistics
- Games played: 86
- Games started: 43
- Fumble recoveries: 1
- Stats at Pro Football Reference

Alan Stuart Veingrad (born July 24, 1963) is an American former professional football player who was an offensive lineman in the National Football League (NFL). He played college football for the East Texas A&M Lions. Veingrad played in the NFL for the Green Bay Packers for five seasons, and for the Dallas Cowboys for two season, winning Super Bowl XXVII with the team over the Buffalo Bills. In his career he played a total of 86 games.

== Early and personal life ==
Veingrad was born in Brooklyn, New York, and lived in Englishtown, New Jersey, from ages three to nine, before moving to Miami, Florida, in 1972. He is Jewish, attended Hebrew school and was bar mitzvah, and grew up in a Jewish household.

He attended Miami Sunset High School. There, he competed in football and was captain of his high school team as well as All-Conference and All-American, and in track and field in discus and shot put.

He married in 1993. Veingrad lived in Fort Lauderdale, Florida, and lives in Boca Raton, Florida, where he works for AIPAC to advocate for Israel.

== College career ==
Veingrad received a scholarship from East Texas State University (now East Texas A&M University), in Commerce, Texas, to play college football and throw the discus. He was converted to an offensive lineman in football, and in 1984 he was named Lone Star All-Conference, Lone Star Offensive Lineman of the Year and received Division II and National Strength & Conditioning All-American honors. The six-foot, five-inch Veingrad worked out extensively and ate a high-carbohydrate diet, resulting in by the end of his freshman year weighing 220 pounds, and by the end of his college career weighing 270 pounds. He ultimately earned his degree. He was inducted into the school's Athletic Hall of Fame in October 2006.

== Professional career ==
Veingrad was considered small for his position, and wasn't selected in the 1985 NFL draft. Although he was selected by the San Antonio Gunslingers in the eleventh round (163rd overall) of the 1985 USFL draft, he opted to sign as an undrafted free agent with the Tampa Bay Buccaneers. He was cut after 10 days.

The Houston Oilers claimed him off waivers, but eventually released him before the start of the 1985 season.

In 1986 he signed with the Green Bay Packers as a free agent, and became the opening day starter at right offensive tackle. He sat out all of the 1988 season with a career-threatening hip injury. His return and consistent play kept heralded rookie Tony Mandarich on the bench in 1989. In 1991, after four seasons as a starter for the Packers, he signed in Plan B free agency with the Dallas Cowboys, where as a backup at tackle and guard, he helped Emmitt Smith win the NFL rushing title in 1991 and 1992. He also helped the Cowboys reach Super Bowl XXVII, although he was one of two players declared inactive for Super Bowl Sunday (the other was Robert Williams).

In his NFL career, he played in 86 games.

== Retirement and public speaker ==
Following the Super Bowl XXVII win, Veingrad retired from football in 1993 and returned to Florida. Veingrad speaks professionally to corporations about leadership and professional development.

== National Jewish Sports Hall of Fame ==
Veingrad was inducted into the National Jewish Sports Hall of Fame on April 19, 2010. The ceremony was held at the Suffolk Y Jewish Community Center in Commack, New York. The organization chronicles and celebrates Jewish involvement in sports, and includes Jewish sports legends such as Sandy Koufax, Red Auerbach, Kerri Strug, and Hank Greenberg.

== See also ==
- List of select Jewish football players
