= Jackson Health System =

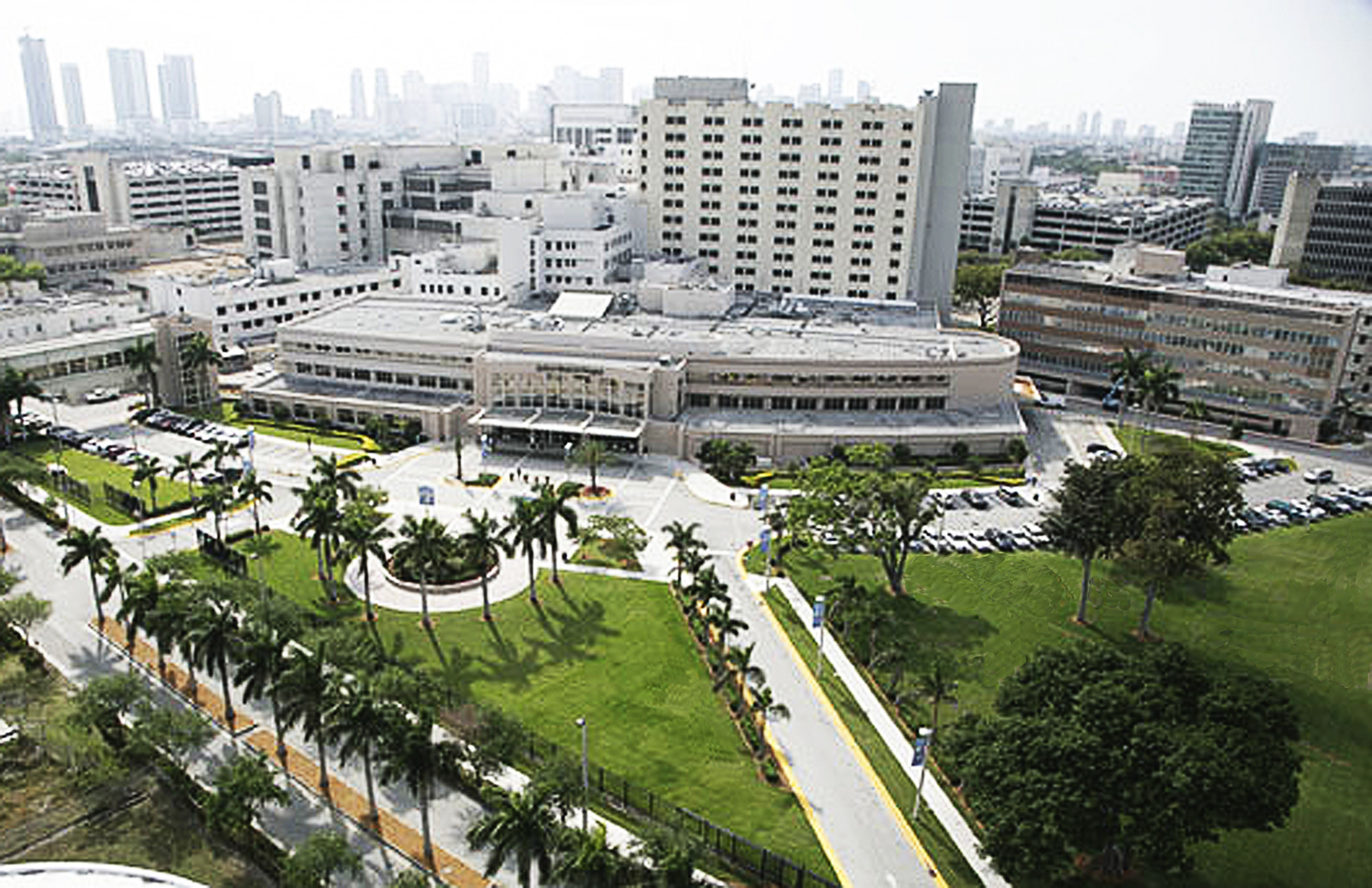
- Founded: June 25, 1918
- Headquarters: Miami, Florida, United States
- Website: www.jacksonhealth.org

Jackson Health System is a nonprofit hospital network in Miami, Florida.

== History ==
On June 25, 1918, Jackson Health System was founded as Miami City Hospital, replacing Friendly Society Hospital. On April 8, 1924, Miami City Hospital was renamed James M. Jackson Memorial Hospital. On September 17, 1926, it treated 700 victims after a hurricane hit the city.

In 1946, it became the first Miami hospital to have a cancer center, and the first in the region to use radium. On January 22, 1953, it opened the first maternity ward for African Americans in Miami-Dade County, originally there babies were only delivered at Old Christian Hospital in Overtown or in homes with the help of midwife. In 1956, the first cardiac surgery was performed by physician Robert S. Litwak In 1960, it began doing kidney dialysis. In 1966, J.K. Johnson became the first African American physician.

In 1992, it opened the Ryder Trauma Center. And it continued to grow by opening clinics, a primary care center and other facilities. In 2001, Jackson Health System was chosen as the company name.

== Mergers and acquisitions ==
In 2001, Jackson Health System purchased Deering Hospital and rebranded it to Jackson South Medical Center. In 2006, it purchased Parkway Regional Medical Center and rebranded it to Jackson North Medical Center.
