= Janice Langbehn =

American activist, social worker and attorney

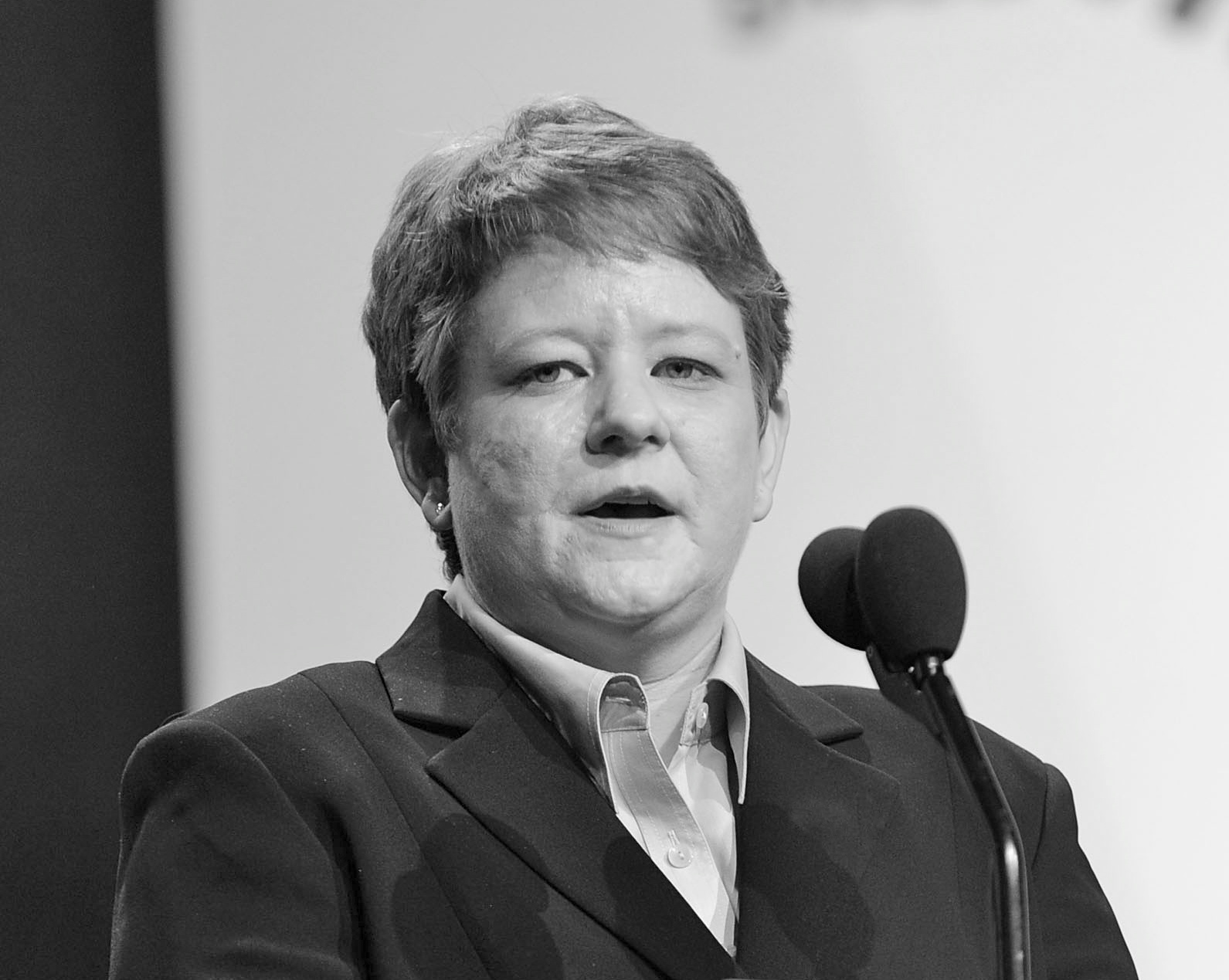
Langbehn in 2011

Janice K. Langbehn (born September 22, 1968) is a gay American activist, social worker, and attorney who became an activist as a result of the events surrounding the death of her partner, Lisa Marie Pond (October 8, 1967 − February 19, 2007). Langbehn earned a master's degree in Public Administration in 1995, a Masters in Social Work from the University of Washington in 2000, and a Juris Doctor from Seattle University in 2018.

== Background story ==
In February 2007, Langbehn and Pond, along with three of their four children, were in Miami, Florida to depart on a cruise. Pond collapsed before the cruise departed and was rushed to Jackson Memorial Hospital's (JMH) Ryder Trauma Center. When Langbehn and their children arrived, a JMH social worker told Langbehn she was in an "anti-gay city and state" and required a health care proxy to see Pond. Langbehn had a power of attorney (POA) which was faxed to the hospital within an hour of Pond's arrival. However, Langbehn and their 3 young children were kept from Pond's side for eight hours. Pond slipped into a coma from a brain aneurysm and died without her partner of 18 years or her children by her side.

== Federal lawsuit ==
When Langbehn unsuccessfully sought an apology from the hospital, she turned to Lambda Legal Defense Fund. Lambda Legal filed suit against Jackson Memorial on June 25, 2008, in the Federal District Court of Miami, FL.

=== Lawsuit dismissed ===
Florida Federal District Court Judge Jordan wrote in his Order to Dismiss,

If the plaintiffs' allegations are true, which I assume that they are when deciding the defendants' 12(b)(6) motion to dismiss, the defendants' lack of sensitivity and attention to Ms. Langbehn, Ms. Pond, and their children caused them needless distress during a time of vulnerability. The defendants' failure to provide Ms. Langbehn and her children frequent updates on Ms. Pond's status, to allow Ms. Langbehn and her children to visit Ms. Pond after emergency medical care ceased; to inform Ms. Langbehn that Ms. Pond had been transferred to the intensive care unit, and to provide Ms. Langbehn Ms. Pond's medical records as she requested, exhibited a lack of compassion and was unbecoming of a renowned trauma center like Ryder. Unfortunately, no relief is available for these failures based on the allegations plead in the amended complaint.

== Media ==
Langbehn was asked to speak publicly about her partner's death for the first time at the Olympia, WA Pride gathering on June 18, 2007, four months after Pond's death. As the family's story caught national attention they were featured in the New York Times by writer Tara Parker-Pope. As a result of the article, White House chief of staff Rahm Emanuel brought the article to the attention of President Barack Obama. On April 15, 2010, President Obama called Langbehn from Air Force One to apologize for the treatment her family received at Jackson Memorial Hospital and to inform her about the Presidential Memorandum he signed earlier that day. President Obama's Memorandum directed the Secretary of Health and Human Services, Kathleen Sebelius to create a rule allowing hospital visitations for same-sex couples comparable to those of married and opposite sex couples. Following Langbehn's phone call with President Obama, she spoke live to CNN news anchor Anderson Cooper on the show Anderson Cooper 360°.

== Committee for Fair Visitation at Jackson Memorial Hospital ==
As a result of the ongoing media attention the "Committee for Fair Visitation at Jackson Memorial Hospital" negotiated changes with the hospital regarding same-sex visitation. The committee consisted of partners throughout the LGBTQ Community including Lambda Legal, Human Rights Campaign (HRC), and Gay and Lesbian Medical Association (GLMA) among others.

On April 13, 2010, Jackson Memorial Hospital in conjunction with the committee announced significant changes to visitation policies regarding LGBTQ patients. In addition to the changes at Jackson Memorial Hospital, the Joint Commission, formerly the Joint Commission on Accreditation of Hospital Organizations - JCAHO, published new guidelines addressing inclusion of LGBTQ patient and families in hospital visitation.

== Healthcare Equality Index ==
In 2007, the Human Rights Campaign published a report entitled the "Healthcare Equality Index" which examined equality of care in US hospitals. In 2010, the HEI reported indicated progress, crediting the Langbehn-Pond story for bringing the issue of hospital visitation for same-sex couples into the public eye. The proposed rule for "Fair Visitation" was issued in November 2010. Over 1,250 public comments were received during the open comment period. In 2010, the Human Rights Campaign published the fourth edition of the Healthcare Equality Index, assessing America's hospitals in their inclusiveness for treating LGBTQ families and individuals. This report was dedicated to the memory of Langbehn's partner, Lisa Marie Pond.

== White House pride celebration ==
On June 22, 2010, Langbehn and her three children met with Secretary Sebelius and then attended a gay pride reception at the White House. Prior to the reception, President Obama met with Langbehn and the children to again offer his apology. While speaking at the reception, President Obama described the struggles the Langbehn-Pond family faced and the impact of his memorandum. The President said, "Just a few moments ago, I met with Janice Langbehn and her children ... And when Janice's partner of 18 years, Lisa, suddenly collapsed because of an aneurysm, Janice and the couple's three kids were denied the chance to comfort their partner and their mom -- barred from Lisa's bedside. It was wrong. It was cruel. And in part because of their story, I instructed my Secretary of Health and Human Services, Kathleen Sebelius, to make sure that any hospital that's participating in Medicare or Medicaid -- that means most hospitals -- (laughter) -- allow gay and lesbian partners the same privileges and visitation rights as straight partners."

== Recognition and awards ==
In 2010, Langbehn was awarded the Olympia, WA "Capital City Pride Award for 2010". On September 25, 2010, Langbehn was awarded the National Equality Award by the Human Rights Campaign for her continued fight for equality in hospital visitation. Langbehn continues to speak for the need of equality for LGBTQ families and impressing upon her audiences that "holding Lisa's hand was not a gay right but a human right." Notable editor of the Windy City Times, Tracy Baim, wrote about the Langbehn-Pond family in her recently published book, Obama and the Gays: A Political Marriage. Also in 2010, the Human Rights Campaign published a Health Care Equality Index assessing America's hospitals' inclusiveness in treating LGBTQ families and individuals. This report was dedicated to the memory of Langbehn's partner, Lisa Marie Pond. Lambda Legal presented Langbehn with their Liberty award in New York City on May 2, 2011.

=== Presidential Citizens Medal ===
On October 20, 2011, President Barack Obama awarded Langbehn with the second highest civilian honor: the Presidential Citizens Medal. Langbehn was one of 13 recipients for 2011. Langbehn's citation read

Janice Langbehn transformed her own profound loss into a resounding call for compassion and equality. When the woman she loved, Lisa Pond, suddenly suffered a brain aneurism, Janice and her children were denied the right to stand beside her in her final moments. Determined to spare others from similar injustice, Janice spoke out to help ensure that same-sex couples can support and comfort each other through some of life's toughest trials. The United States honors Janice Langbehn for advancing America's promise for equality for all.

== Public policy change ==
The hospital visitation rule requiring all hospital receiving Medicare and Medicaid funding to allow for LGBTQ family visitation went into effect January 18, 2011.

A short film, Quiet, a fictionalized version of Lisa's death, is receiving awards and showing at Academy Award-qualifying festivals. The film is dedicated to the memory of Lisa Pond and how her death catapulted LGBTQ hospital visitation to the forefront of publicly policy.

As of 2025, Langbehn resides in Tacoma, Washington and practices family law. The children Pond and she adopted from the Washington state foster care program are adults.

== Lisa Marie Pond ==
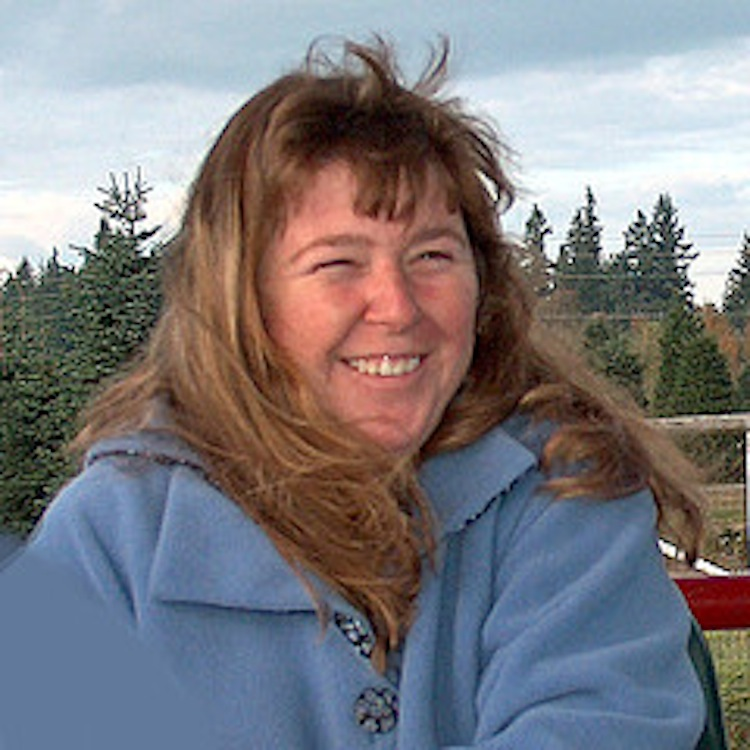
Lisa Marie Pond

Langbehn's partner of 18 years, Lisa Marie Pond, collapsed on February 18, 2007, after a fatal brain aneurysm. She was 39 years old. Arriving at the Ryder Trauma Center at Jackson Memorial Hospital in Miami, Langbehn was barred from seeing Pond. Langbehn could not see Pond or receive information about her health status. Langbehn contacted friends in their hometown, Lacey, Washington, and the required documents were faxed to the hospital. Pond died the following morning at 10:45am EST and per her wishes outlined in her Living Will her organs were donated saving four lives. Pond's partner and children participated in the Tournament of Roses Parade on January 2, 2012, celebrating Pond's organ donations.
