= Eclipsys =

Eclipsys Corporation
- Type: Public (Nasdaq: ECLP)
- Industry: healthcare information technology
- Founded: 1995
- Headquarters: Atlanta, Georgia
- Key people: Philip Pead, (chief executive officer); Gene Fife, (chairman)
- Products: electronic medical records computerized physician order entry
- Revenue: ▲$519.18 million (2009)
- Operating income: ▼$11.98 million (2009)
- Net income: ▼$2.71 million (2009)
- Total assets: ▼$697.06 million (2009)
- Total equity: ▲$435072 million (2009)
- Number of employees: 2,800

Eclipsys Corporation is a publicly traded American company that provided hospitals and other healthcare organizations with electronic medical record, computerized physician order entry, and other technology, as well as revenue cycle management software. Eclipsys was founded in 1995, and had its headquarters in Atlanta, Georgia.

== History ==
Eclipsys was founded in 1995 by Harvey J. Wilson, who remained with the company until 2002. In 1998, the company acquired Motorola's Emtek Healthcare Division, a provider of point-of-care clinical information software. In 2008, the company acquired physician practice management software and electronic health records company MediNotes. The company restructured in 2006, and Philip Pead became chief executive officer in 2009. In 2010, Eclipsys announced a strategic partnership with Microsoft, in which the companies would share technology and promote healthcare information technology interoperability. Another partnership agreement was signed in 2010. Eclipsys merged with Allscripts in August 2010.
