= Halissee Hall =

Historic place in Florida, United States

- U.S. National Register of Historic Places
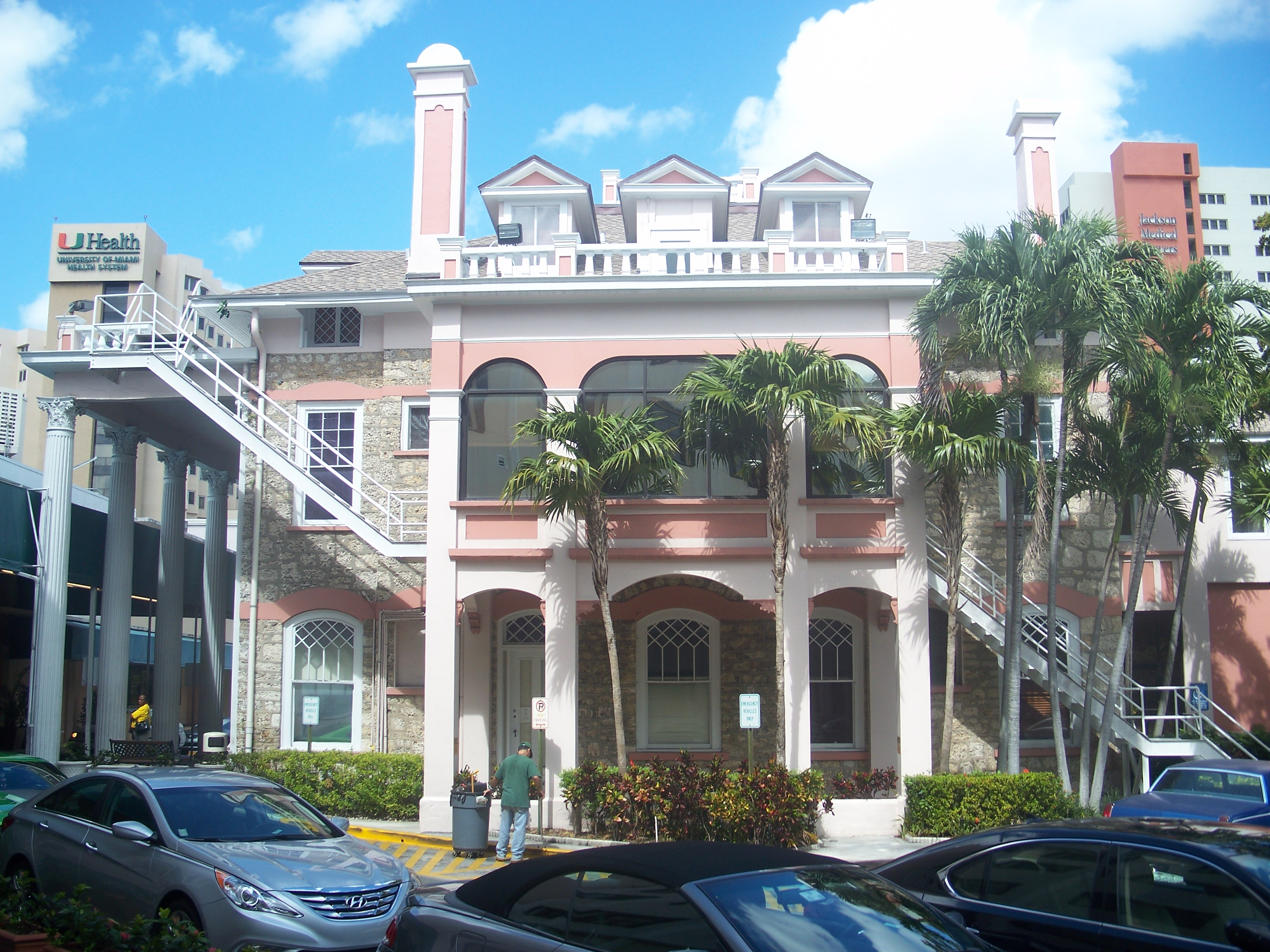
- Halissee Hall in April 2011

- Location within Miami Location within Florida Location within the United States
- Location: Miami, Florida, U.S.
- Coordinates: 25°47′20.706″N 80°12′51.4974″W
- NRHP reference No.: 74000618
- Added to NRHP: October 1, 1974

The Halissee Hall is a historic site in Miami, Florida. It is located at 1475 NW 12th Avenue. On October 1, 1974, it was added to the U.S. National Register of Historic Places.
