= Jackson Memorial Hospital =

Coordinates: 25°47′29.49″N 80°12′45.27″W

- Jackson Health System

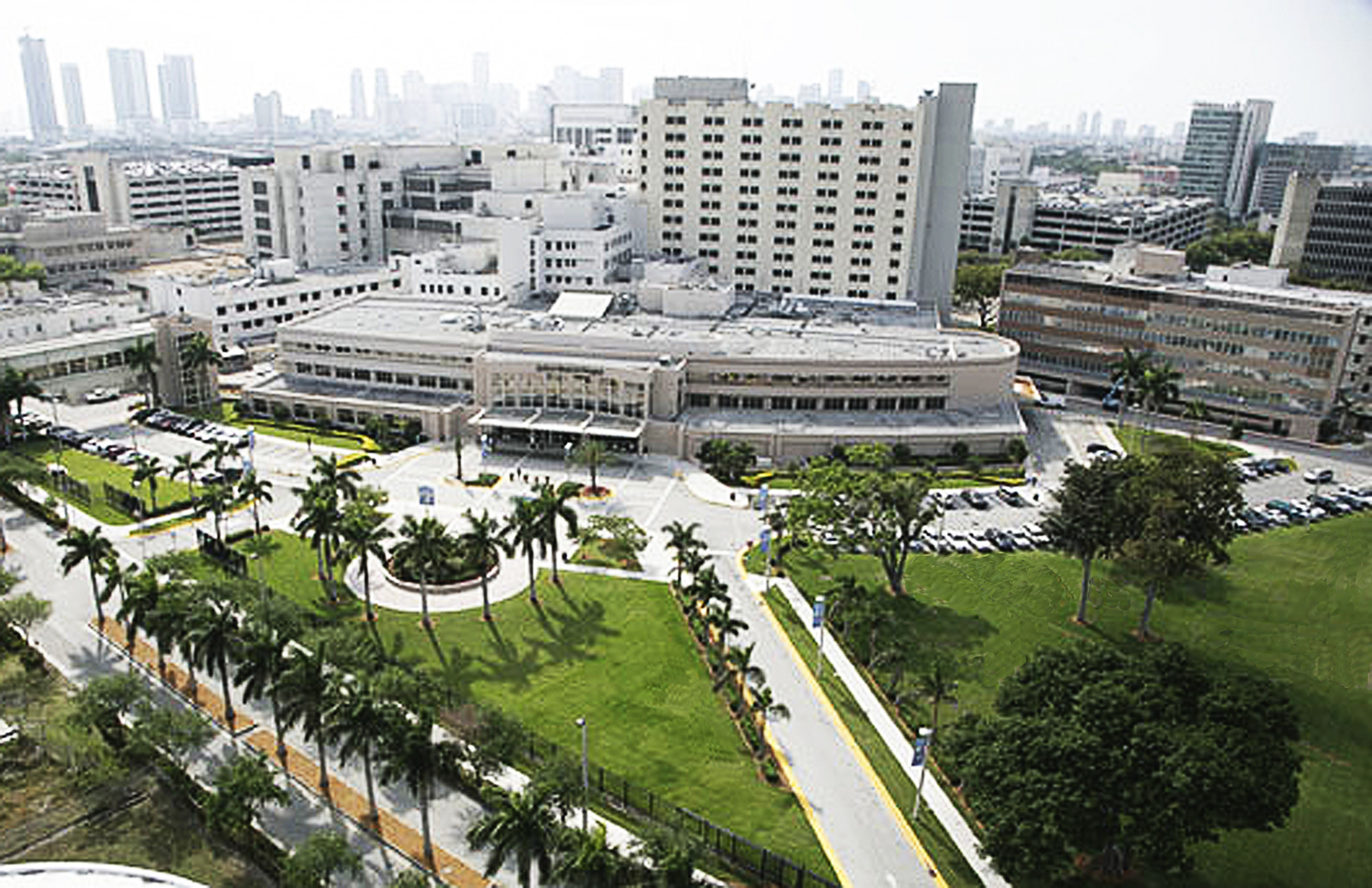
- Jackson Memorial Hospital in Miami in July 2016

Geography
- Location: Miami, Health District, Florida, U.S.

Organisation
- Care system: Public hospital
- Type: Teaching; County-owned and operated
- Affiliated university: University of Miami; Florida International University; Ross University School of Medicine; American University of the Caribbean School of Medicine

Services
- Emergency department: Level 1 Trauma center
- Beds: 1,488

Helipads
- Helipad: Yes

History
- Founded: 1918

Links
- Website: jacksonhealth.org
- Lists: Hospitals in U.S.

Jackson Memorial Hospital, also referred to as Jackson or abbreviated JMH, is a non-profit, tertiary care hospital, and the primary teaching hospital of the University of Miami's School of Medicine. As of 2021, it is the largest hospital in the United States by number of beds, according to Becker's Hospital Review.

The hospital is located in Miami's Health District at 1611 NW 12th Avenue at the Northwest quadrant of Interstate 95 and the Dolphin East-West Expressway, two of metropolitan Miami's most heavily trafficked highways. The hospital is accessible by Miami Metrorail's rapid transit system at the UHealth–Jackson station stop at 1501 Northwest 12th Avenue in Miami.

Jackson Memorial Hospital is the center of a medical campus in Miami's Health District that includes Miami's Veterans Administration Medical Center, the University of Miami Hospital (UHealth Tower), and the University of Miami's Miller School of Medicine with its research affiliates, laboratories, and institutes, including the University of Miami Sylvester Comprehensive Cancer Center, the University of Miami's Bascom Palmer Eye Institute, an ophthalmology hospital, the Anne Bates Leach Eye Hospital, the Diabetes Research Foundation, the National Parkinson's Foundation, and the University of Miami's Project to Cure Paralysis.

Jackson Memorial Hospital's Miami Transplant Institute is the largest transplant center in the U.S., performing more transplants in 2019 than any U.S. center has ever performed, 747 in a single year. It is the only hospital in Florida to perform every kind of organ transplant for both adult and pediatric patients.

It is currently the third-largest public hospital and third-largest teaching hospital in the United States. The hospital is a referral center, a magnet for research and home to the Ryder Trauma Center, the only Level 1 adult and pediatric trauma center in Miami-Dade County, the most populous county in Florida and the seventh-most populous county in the nation.

Jackson Memorial is the centerpiece of the Jackson Health System, owned and operated by Miami-Dade County through the Public Health Trust. The hospital is supported by Miami-Dade County residents through a half-cent sales tax. In 2014, the Public Health Trust received $364 million in unrestricted funds from Miami-Dade County. In 2013, Miami-Dade voters approved a separate $830 million bond program for major upgrades to the facility.

== Rankings and awards ==
In 2015, Jackson Memorial Hospital received one star out of a possible best of five stars in the Medicare.Gov Hospital Compare survey. In 2007, three University of Miami specialties at Jackson Memorial Hospital were ranked among the best in the country by U.S. News & World Report: The University of Miami Bascom Palmer Eye Institute was ranked as the best ophthalmologic center in the nation, Jackson Memorial's Ear, Nose and Throat program was ranked 17th-best in the nation, and its digestive disorders and kidney disease programs were ranked 32nd-best in the nation.

Jackson Memorial is home to Holtz Children's Hospital, which has 254 licensed beds and cares for children—newborn to 21 years old—with everything from common ailments to multi-organ transplants. Holtz was ranked among the top hospitals in treating child kidney disorders.

== Denial of partner access ==
In 2007, Jackson Memorial Hospital denied a lesbian, Janice Langbehn, access to her partner of 17 years as she was dying of an aneurysm. Langbehn also claimed that Jackson refused to take medical information about her partner from Langbehn, and ignored a power of attorney sent via fax to the hospital's trauma center.

A lawsuit was filed against the hospital as a result. Jackson stated that "it has no obligation to allow their patients' visitors nor any obligation whatsoever to their patients’ families, healthcare surrogates, and visitors." The presiding judge, Adalberto Jordan, dismissed the case, stating that Langbehn had no relief under Florida law. Jordan found that Langbehn had not been "denied the right to make any medical decision on behalf of" her partner.

Two days after Jackson's announcement, in part as a result of Langbehn's story, President Barack Obama issued a memorandum ordering hospitals receiving Medicare and Medicaid funding to allow patients to decide who can visit them and prohibit discrimination, including sexual orientation and gender identity.

== Notable events ==
- In 2004, the owner of two Subway franchises located inside Jackson Memorial Hospital came up with selling foot-long subs for a lower price at his two stores on the weekends to help spur business. It eventually led to the Subway $5 footlong promotion, which was launched nationally in 2008 and became Subway's most successful promotion ever, influencing other businesses.
- On June 7, 2012, 16-year-old Yasser Lopez made national news when he successfully underwent a delicate three-hour neurosurgical operation to remove a spear that a speargun fired into his skull when it was accidentally discharged during a fishing trip. Three feet of the spear protruded from the wound above his eye socket, and that part had to be specially cut off so he could get a brain CT scan. No major blood vessels were harmed and the only impairments he reported from the incident were amnesia for the period during and around the event, and some sluggishness in a hand.

== Notable patients ==
=== Births ===
- July 1, 1945: Singer Debbie Harry was born at the hospital. Her birth name was Angela Trimble, and she was given up for adoption, eventually being adopted in New Jersey at the age of six months.

=== Deaths ===
- May 11, 1981: Reggae icon Bob Marley died at the hospital at the age of 36. He was in the process of flying home to Jamaica from Germany when his vital signs rapidly deteriorated due to previously diagnosed cancer. After landing at Miami International Airport, Marley was taken to the hospital for immediate medical attention. The spread of melanoma to his lungs and brain was ruled the cause of death. His final words, uttered at the hospital to his son Ziggy, were: "Money can't buy life."
- February 8, 1997: Professional motorcycle stunt rider Corey Scott was pronounced dead at Jackson Memorial Hospital after his motorcycle stunt went horribly wrong at the Miami Orange Bowl. The fatal accident was witnessed by a crowd of thousands and was captured on camera.
- July 15, 1997: Fashion icon Gianni Versace was declared dead at Jackson Memorial Hospital after being shot in front of Casa Casuarina, his Ocean Drive mansion, in Miami Beach.
- November 27, 2007: Former University of Miami and Washington Redskins football player Sean Taylor was declared dead on arrival at Jackson Memorial Hospital after being shot at his Miami-area home.
- October 10, 2024: Cuban Reggaeton singer El Taiger died of a gunshot wound.

=== Hospitalizations ===
- May 29, 2011: Rapper Sean Kingston was taken to the Jackson Memorial Hospital after being involved in a jet ski accident with a female passenger. He was discharged on June 24.
- July 7, 2021: Martine Moïse, the former first lady of Haiti, was treated at the Ryder Trauma Center at Jackson Memorial Hospital, following the assassination of the president, her husband.

== Notable physicians ==
- Kazi Mobin-Uddin, who invented the first inferior vena cava filter, trained at Jackson Memorial Hospital.

== In popular culture ==
- In 2010, the hospital appeared in Jeffrey Archer's short story, "Where There's a Will", published in And Thereby Hangs a Tale.
