= El Taiger =

Cuban reggaeton singer (1987–2024)

- Born: José Manuel Carbajal Zaldívar; 6 September 1987; Cuba
- Died: 10 October 2024 (aged 37) Jackson Memorial Hospital, Miami, Florida, U.S.
- Genres: Reggaeton; cubatón
- Occupation: Reggaeton artist

José Manuel Carbajal Zaldívar (6 September 1987 – 10 October 2024), better known by his stage name El Taiger, was a Cuban reggaeton artist.

== Musical career ==
El Taiger was one of the most popular cubatón artists. He began his artistic career in the band Los 4, later joining another, the group Los Desiguales, before consolidating himself as a solo singer, becoming one of the most influential voices in Cuban urban music scene. There he introduced his personal brand "the Fashaton", where he fused his musical style with an innovative clothing proposal. This new trend and his growing popularity lead him to adopt a stage name, first as 'El Más Tigre', then 'El Tigraso' and finally 'El Taiger'.

Some of his most popular songs are "La Historia" and "Marca Mandarina". Among his songs are "El Ignorante", "El Papelito", "El Punto", "El Sano" and "Habla Matador", where he used Cuban-rooted urban sound. In latter song, he performed together with Puerto Rican singers Bad Bunny, Cosculluela, Bryant Myers, and Colombian artists J Balvin.

He released his first album, Taiger, in 2016. It was released on the label Rottboyz.

El Taiger was featured on the track "La Habana", which was included in The Fate of the Furious soundtrack.

The artist released his last studio album, 10 Éxitos Duros, in July.

His notable collaborations with international stars like Bad Bunny and J Balvin helped him reach a broader audience, reinforcing his influence in the Latin music community.

== Personal life ==
José Manuel Carbajal Zaldivar "El Taiger" worked together with his cousin, Jorge Junior, in the Cuban music group Los 4.

On September 25, 2020, he posted online that his mother had died at the age of 53. Some of his friends and accompanists stated that this tragedy started a decline in the singer's emotional state.

He was a devout Catholic, and tattoed an image of the virgin Mary on his head. He also regularly visited his grandmother and his daughters back in Cuba.

== Legal troubles ==
On 28 March 2023, he was arrested for possession of narcotics/controlled substances, more specifically cocaine and methamphetamines. He was later released on a $10,000 bail ($5,000 for each charge).

On 27 November 2023, El Taiger was arrested after an altercation with a security guard outside a Macy's store on the accusation that he had shoplifted a Miami Heat jersey.

In June 2024, El Taiger was arrested because he was driving with a suspended license. A month later, in July 2024, El Taiger was arrested again on suspicion of robbery, assault, and cocaine possession.

== Death ==
El Taiger was found shot in the head inside his car in Miami, Florida, on 3 October 2024 after being shot in Hialeah outside of Galloso's home following a dispute. He was taken to Jackson Memorial Hospital, where he died on 10 October at the age of 37.

During his final days, it was revealed that El Taiger did not have health insurance, which complicated his medical care. Public figures and fans raised funds to support his recovery while his family awaited visas to join him in the United States. His cousin, Jorgito Jr. was able to come to Miami from Cuba shortly before his death.

His passing created great unification in social media and in Miami along his fans and the whole genre. His fans gathered outside of the hospital and delivered a tribute, playing his music and honking horns of cars. Many murals were painted around the city of Miami, as well as Cuba honoring the artist. A memorial was put in place shortly after his death outside of the hospital where he passed where fans can go and honor El Taiger.

Damián Valdez-Galloso, a known criminal, was named as a person of interest in connection to the incident.

Videos have surfaced following the investigation, where the murder is seen taking place, as well as Galloso's actions following the fatal shooting. Bodycam footage of El Taiger being found outside the hospital have also surfaced. Videos of El Taiger with Galloso at his house and in the studio have also surfaced, showing their close relationship prior to the shooting.

== Legacy ==
His death was widely mourned, and fans around the world paid tribute to his contributions to Cuban and Latin urban music. El Taiger is remembered for his contributions to Cuban reggaeton and Latin urban music. His unique fusion of Cuban sounds with contemporary urban genres influenced the development of Cuban reggaeton on an international level.

== See also ==
- List of Cubans
