= Maria T. Abreu =

American gastroenterologist

- Born: 1966 (age 59–60); West New York, New Jersey, U.S.
- Awards: Inducted into the Association of American Physicians

Academic background
- Education: University of Miami (BS); Miller School of Medicine, University of Miami (MD)

Academic work
- Institutions: Miller School of Medicine at the University of Miami

Maria Teresa Abreu is an American gastroenterologist with a focus on inflammatory bowel disease. She was inducted into the Academy of Science, Engineering and Medicine of Florida for "her research in advancing understanding of therapeutic drug monitoring genotype–phenotype associations in inflammatory bowel diseases".

== Early life and education ==
Abreu was born in 1966 in West New York, New Jersey to Cuban immigrant parents. She lived in New Jersey until the age of 13 when her family moved to Miami.

Abreu graduated from Miami Sunset Senior High School in 1984 and received a $1000 scholarship from the state Science and Engineering Fair. Following high school, she enrolled at the University of Miami.

She attended the Miller School of Medicine at the University of Miami, and completed her residency in internal medicine at Brigham and Women’s Hospital and her gastroenterology fellowship at the David Geffen School of Medicine at UCLA.

== Career ==
In 2008, Abreu returned to the University of Miami, where she served as chief of gastroenterology from 2008 to 2016. While serving in this role, she operationalized the "University of Miami IBD Center Clinical Phenotype Database and Tissue Repository." As a result of her research, Abreu was inducted into the American Society for Clinical Investigation and Association of American Physicians.

During the COVID-19 pandemic, Abreu began a study on whether treatment for IBD, or living with the disorder, could increase a patient’s risk of becoming infected by the novel coronavirus. Her research team conducted experiments on mice exhibiting inflammation associated with human colitis, where they failed to locate any increase in the presence of ACE2 (converting enzyme 2) or TMPRSS2 (transmembrane serine protease 2). Later that year, she also published a study that found diets low in fat and high in fiber could improve the quality of life of patients with ulcerative colitis. In 2019, Dr. Abreu received the Sherman Prize for Excellence in Crohn's and Colitis.

In 2021, she was inducted into the Academy of Science, Engineering and Medicine of Florida for "her research in advancing understanding of therapeutic drug monitoring genotype–phenotype associations in inflammatory bowel diseases." Abreu also received the 2020 Lifetime Disruptor award from the American College of Gastroenterology.
