= Miller School of Medicine =

Medical school of the University of Miami

University of Miami Miller School of Medicine
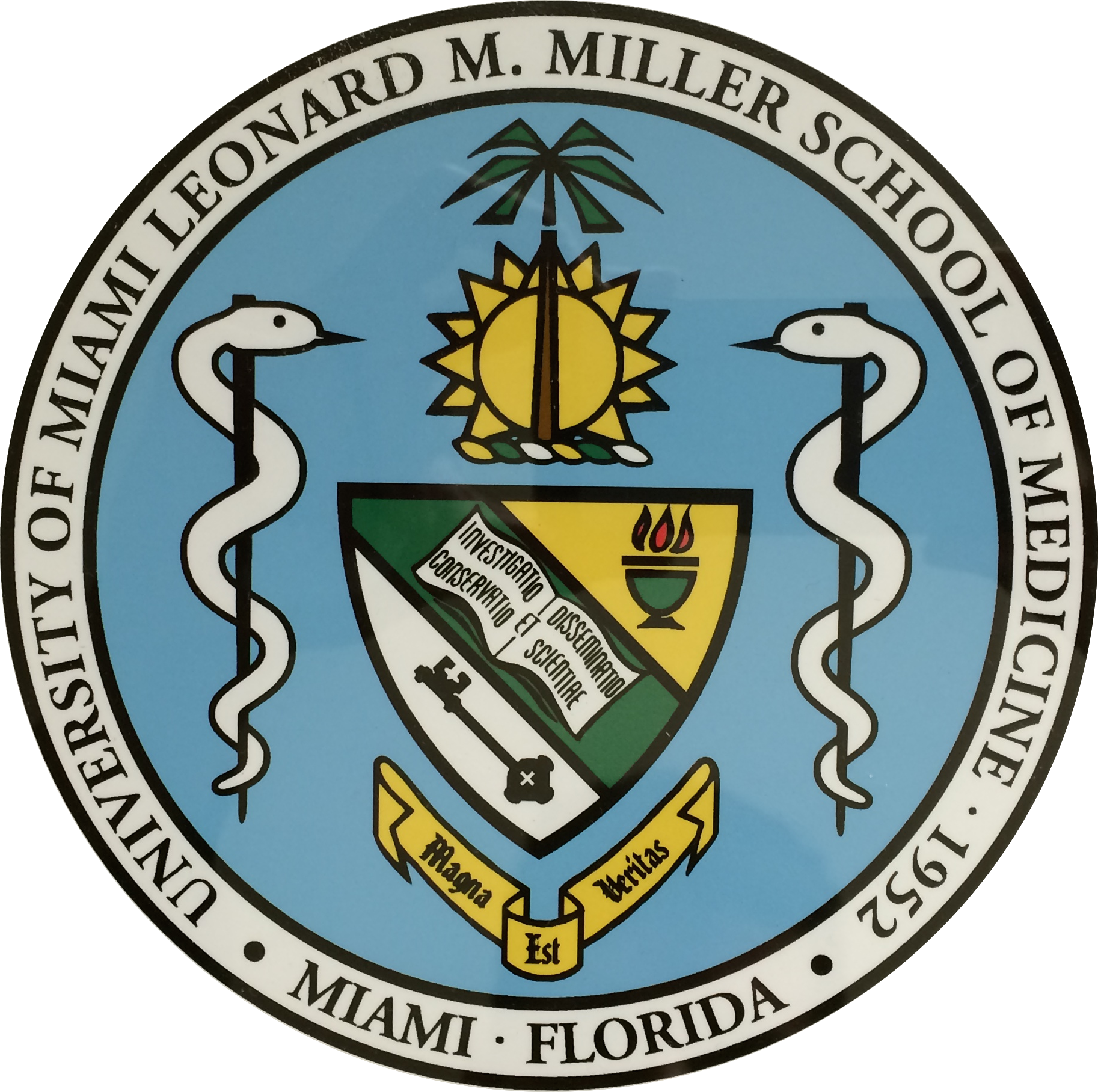
- Type: Private
- Established: 1952
- Dean: Henri Ford, MD
- Faculty: 1,397
- Students: 814 medical, 567 graduate
- Location: Miami, Florida, U.S. 25°47′30.5″N 80°12′43.2″W
- Campus: Urban
- Website: www.med.miami.edu

The University of Miami Miller School of Medicine, officially Leonard M. Miller School of Medicine, is the University of Miami's graduate medical school in Miami, Florida. Founded in 1952, it is the oldest medical school in the state of Florida.

== Campus ==
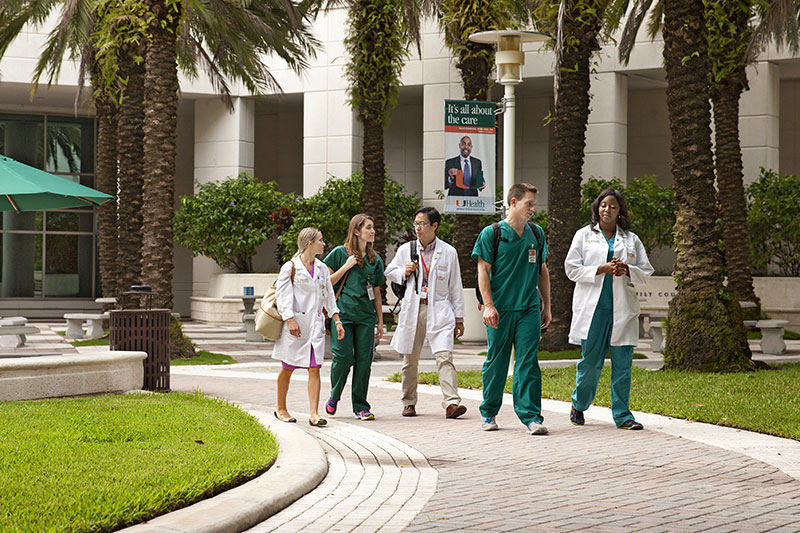
Students on the Miller School of Medicine campus in Miami in July 2016

The University of Miami Leonard M. Miller School of Medicine is located in Miami’s Health District.

Several hospitals on the medical campus operate independently of the university, including Jackson Memorial Hospital, Holtz Children's Hospital, and Miami Veterans Administration Healthcare System. Jackson Memorial Hospital serves as the primary teaching hospital for the school.

== Academic affiliations ==
The Miller School of Medicine is associated with multiple hospitals. Residency and fellowship training for medical students is conducted in collaboration with Jackson Memorial Hospital and a range of other healthcare facilities, each operating under its own administration.

== Joint programs ==
Miller School of Medicine offers joint-degree programs in coordination with other disciplines at the University of Miami:

- M.D./Ph.D. in conjunction with the University of Miami's Program in Biomedical Sciences and Program in Public Health Sciences, through the Medical Scientist Training Program
- M.D./JD. in conjunction with the University of Miami School of Law
- M.D./MBA in conjunction with the University of Miami School of Business
- M.D./M.S. in Genomic Science
- M.D./MPH Beginning in 2011, the medical school and the University of Miami's Department of Public Health Sciences initiated a four-year joint M.D./M.P.H. program designed to train public health physicians.

=== Rankings ===
The University of Miami Miller School of Medicine received $149.5 million in NIH funding in 2019.

As of 2024, U.S. News & World Report listed the school among the second-tier medical schools for research in the U.S.

The school has contributed to research in ophthalmology, with EduRank recognizing its performance in 2022.

Bascom Palmer Eye Institute has been ranked the number one Ophthalmology hospital in the world 24 times. It was the number one Ophthalmology hospital for the last 22 years, as of 2025, as ranked by USNews and world report.

Holtz Children's Hospital has been mentioned in national assessments for select pediatric specialties. Similarly, in 2018, the Bascom Palmer Eye Institute was noted by Expertscape for its involvement in Type 1 diabetes care.

The University of Miami Physical Therapy Department has been historically ranked among the nation's best by U.S. News and World Report.

== Academic and research programs ==
The University of Miami Miller School of Medicine is a research institution. It is affiliated with Jackson Memorial Hospital, a major teaching hospital in Miami, Florida. Its academic and research programs include:

- Harvey Teaching Mannequin – A cardiology training tool developed at the school.
- Interdisciplinary Stem Cell Institute (ISCI) – Conducts research in regenerative medicine, particularly in hematopoietic stem cell therapies.
- The Miami Project to Cure Paralysis – A research center focusing on spinal cord injury and paralysis.

== Admissions ==
The 2019 entering class had an average overall GPA of 3.72, a science GPA of 3.67, and composite MCAT in the 87th percentile.

In 2018, 173 out of a total 9,164 applicants to Miller School's combined MD/MPH class were interviewed for a class of 54 students. The entering class presented an overall GPA average of 3.66, a science GPA of 3.54, and a composite MCAT score in the 84th percentile.

== Donations ==
In December 2004, the University of Miami School of Medicine received a $100 million donation from the family of Leonard M. Miller, former president and CEO of Lennar.

In February 2014, fashion designer Oscar de la Renta presented his "Designed for A Cure 2014" collection in Miami, as part of a fundraiser supporting the Sylvester Comprehensive Cancer Center at the University of Miami Miller School of Medicine.

Later that year, in October 2014, The Lennar Foundation announced a $50 million donation for the establishment of a new ambulatory care center in Coral Gables, Florida. Plans for the facility included the eventual relocation of the University of Miami Student Health Center.

In May 2015, Stuart Miller, chairman of Lennar and chairman of the University of Miami Board of Trustees, announced a $50 million donation for the construction of a new medical education building on the medical center campus.

== Notable alumni ==
- Maria T. Abreu (alumni and faculty), gastroenterologist
- Daniel T. Barry (alumni), NASA astronaut
- Gloria Hemingway (alumni), daughter of Ernest Hemingway
- Glenn Laffel (alumni), physician and health IT entrepreneur
- Eliseo J. Pérez-Stable (alumni), physician-scientist, director of National Institute on Minority Health and Health Disparities
- David Perlmutter (alumni), American physician, author, and scholar
- Michael Welner (alumni), forensic psychiatrist

== Notable faculty ==
- Maria T. Abreu, (alumni and faculty), professor of gastroenterologist
- Thomas J. Balkany, professor of neurotology and otorhinolaryngology
- Mary Bartlett Bunge, former professor of neuroscience and paralysis
- Erin Marcus, professor of internal medicine
- Ralph Sacco, professor, chair of neurology, and former president, American Heart Association
- Gordon Zubrod, former chair of oncology and director of the Comprehensive Cancer Center (Now Sylvester Comprehensive Cancer Center)

== In popular culture ==
On FX's reality television series Nip/Tuck, plastic surgeons Sean McNamara and Christian Troy are graduates of the University of Miami School of Medicine.

== See also ==
- List of University of Miami alumni
