= Practice Fusion =

Electronic health record company

Practice Fusion, Inc.
- Company type: Subsidiary
- Industry: Healthcare Information Technology
- Founded: 2005
- Headquarters: San Francisco, CA, US
- Key people: Ryan Howard, Founder, Former CEO until 2015; Tom Langan, CEO; Alan Wong, Co-Founder; Jonathan Malek, Co-Founder & CTO; Matthew Douglass, Co-Founder
- Products: Electronic health records, Personal health record, Patient portals, Data analysis, Health care analytics
- Parent: Allscripts (2018–present)
- Website: www.practicefusion.com/

Practice Fusion is a web-based electronic health record (EHR) company based in San Francisco, CA. The company was founded in 2005 by Ryan Howard and acquired by Allscripts in 2018.

In 2014, Practice Fusion was the largest cloud-based electronic health record (EHR) platform for doctors and patients,. Practice Fusion is used by more than 112,000 monthly active healthcare professionals with over 100 million patient records under management. In 2014, Practice Fusion's EHR facilitated over 56 million patient visits (approximately 6% of all ambulatory visits in the US) and was the fastest growing EHR in the US.

In 2015, Howard left the company and Tom Langan became interim CEO. Under Langan's leadership, the company contributed to the opioid epidemic in the United States by engaging in a kickback scheme to increase the volume of opioid prescriptions amidst its clients and their respective patients. The company has been charged a $145 million fine, the largest criminal fine in Vermont's history. In June 2018 the company transitioned over to a paid subscription based system. Practice Fusion is available to users in the USA only.

== History ==
Practice Fusion is an electronic health record (EHR) company, founded in 2005 by Ryan Howard, Alan Wong, Jonathan Malek, and Matthew Douglass. The first version of the product was launched in 2007 and initially gained little traction in the tough economy.

The company began to grow in 2009, when the EHR and customer support were made free of charge. In May 2009, Band of Angels and Felicis Ventures became the first major investors in the company, followed by Salesforce.com in June, Morgenthaler Ventures in December 2010, and Founders Fund in April 2011. The company closed a $70 million Series D round of financing led by Kleiner Perkins Caufield & Byers in September 2013, followed by a $15 million Series D extension in December 2013 led by Qualcomm Ventures, bringing total funding to date to $149 million.

In June 2011, the product achieved Office of the National Coordinator for Health Information Technology Meaningful Use Certification. From 2011 to 2013, it was named the No. 1 EMR for customer satisfaction among primary care providers in addition to being named No. 1 for e-prescribing client satisfaction and helping doctors achieve Meaningful Use by Brown-Wilson's Black Book Rankings. In September 2013, KLAS Reports named it the No. 1 EHR system for value among ambulatory professionals.

In 2015, Howard left the company and Practice Fusion was starting to look for a buyer. In 2016, an IPO valued the company at up to $1.5 billion.

In the fall of 2016, under Tom Langan's leadership, the company accepted remuneration from a "major" manufacturer of opioids, referred to as "Pharma Co. X" in exchange for clinical decision support, to prompt doctors to take certain clinical actions in order to increase prescriptions of extended-release opioids.

Practice Fusion was sold to Allscripts for $100 million in 2018.

In January 2020, the company (as a subsidiary of Allscripts) admitted in court to have accepted $1 million in kickbacks by "Pharma Co. X" in return for a deferred prosecution agreement. Practice Fusion was fined $145 million for the misconduct by the Department of Justice for the District of Vermont. In the DOJ investigation, Langan and Loomis are identified as the primary operates in the scheme.

== Services ==
The Software as a service startup has been providing physicians and medical professionals with advertising-supported electronic health records and medical practice management technology which included charting, scheduling, e-prescribing (eRx), medical billing, laboratory and imaging center integrations, referral letters, Meaningful Use certification, training, support and a personal health record for patients.

=== Products (2013) ===
- Practice Fusion: Web-based electronic health record (EHR) software for physicians and medical professionals. The EHR system includes medical charting, e-prescribing, clinical decision support advisories, online booking and scheduling, online referrals, and messaging. Its lab, imaging, and billing modules integrate with a network of third-party laboratories, medical imaging centers, and medical billing services. All offerings are HIPAA-compliant.
- Patient Fusion: Personal health record (PHR) system that gives patients access to their prescriptions, diagnoses and test results. Records update as physicians adds information to their patients’ charts. Consumers can search physicians by location and specialty, and request an appointment online.
- Insight by Practice Fusion: An analytic product based on the Practice Fusion dataset of 81 million patient records. Real-time data provides perspective on clinical trends and helps with population health management and clinical decision support.
